= Polden =

Polden may refer to:

- Chilton Polden, rural village and civil parish near Edington, north of the Polden Hills in the Sedgemoor district of Somerset, England
- East Polden Grasslands, Site of Special Scientific Interest on the Polden Hills in Somerset
- Gale & Polden, British printer and publisher
- Polden Hills, long, low ridge, extending for 20 miles, parallel to the Mendip Hills in Somerset, England
