= The Shoe Museum =

Museum in Somerset, England

The Shoe Museum in Street, Somerset, England closed to the public on 27th September 2019, reopening in September 2025 as The Shoemakers Museum.

C &J Clark opened the Shoe Museum in 1974 in the oldest part of the factory building in Street. Admission was free and attracted some 45,000 visitors a year

C&J Clark Ltd and the Clark family started making slippers, shoes and boots in the town in the 1820s and the company grew, introducing mechanised processes in the 1860s. Production continued until after 2000 when it was moved off-shore, using third party factories, predominantly located in Asia. In the 19th century, in line with the family's Quaker values, the capital was also extended beyond the factory to benefit social initiatives in Street: a school was founded so that young men and women could combine working in the factory with continuing their education, a theatre was opened, a library was built, along with an open-air swimming pool, known as Greenbank, and town hall. The company still has its headquarters in Street, behind a frontage which includes the clock tower and water tower, In 1993 the redundant factory buildings were converted to form Clarks Village.

The Shoe Museum closed to the public on 27 September 2019, and its artefacts were transferred to the ownership of the Alfred Gillett Trust. In September 2023, planning permission was granted to the Alfred Gillett Trust to build a new Museum called Shoemakers Museum at The Grange, a Grade II listed building, making the collections accessible to the public. The new brick building with a contemporary design created by Purcell Architects joins the Georgian Grange manor house, to a barn with medieval origins. The new museum opened in September 2025, alongside the Shoemaker's Cafe which brings the manor house into use alongside the new museum buildings.

== See also ==
- Concealed shoes
