= Ewan Richards =

English rugby union player

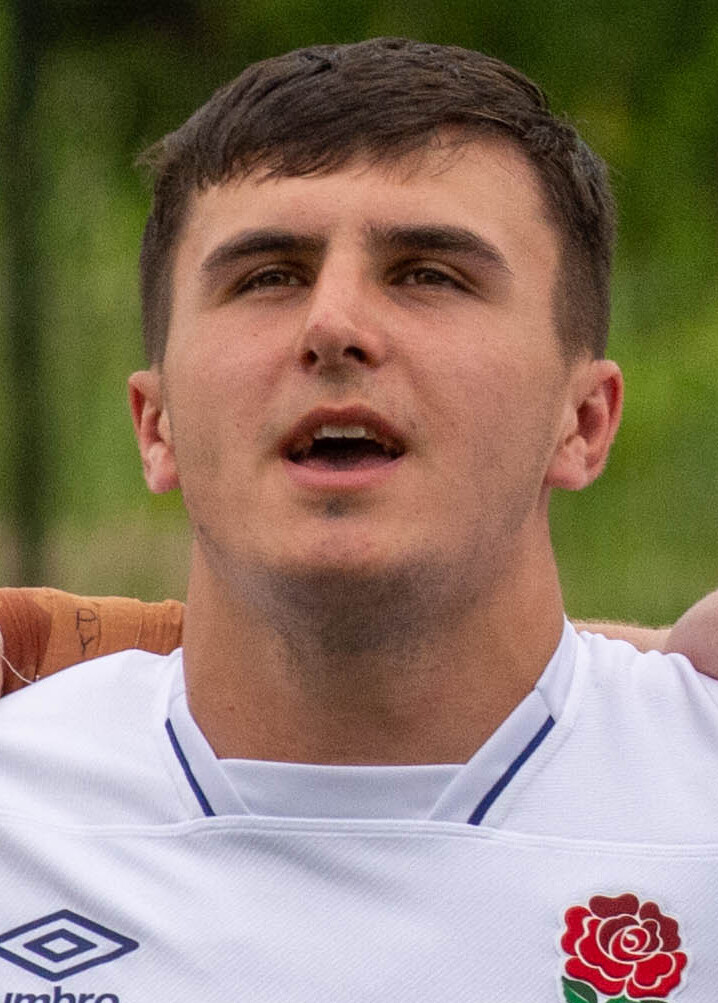
- Richards in 2022
- Born: 6 April 2002 (age 24) Yeovil, England
- Height: 1.98 m (6 ft 6 in)
- Weight: 112 kg (247 lb; 17 st 9 lb)
- School: Crispin School; Millfield School

Rugby union career
- Position(s): Lock, Back Row
Youth career
- 2012–2018: Wells RFC
Senior career
Years	Team	Apps	(Points)
2021–	Bath Rugby	62	(50)
- Correct as of 1 May 2026
International career
Years	Team	Apps	(Points)
2018–2019	England U18	9	(0)
2021–2022	England U20	12	(20)
2025–	England A	1	(0)
- Correct as of 15 November 2025

Ewan Richards (born 6 April 2002) is an English professional rugby union player who plays for Bath Rugby either in the second row or back row.

== Early life ==
From Street, Somerset, Richards attended Crispin School before receiving an offer to join Millfield on a scholarship. In 2021, at 18 years-of-age he progressed to the Bath Rugby senior academy.

== Club career ==
Richards played for Tor RFC and Wells RFC in his native Somerset prior to playing for Bath Rugby. Richards made his debut for Bath in the Premiership in February 2021. After going on to make 15 appearances either in the second row or the back row, he signed a long-term contract with the club in May 2022. His performances during that campaign also led to him winning Bath Breakthrough player of the year award.

During the 2022-23 season Richards tore his hamstring and missed a few months of the season before playing some loan games for Taunton R.F.C. to build up his match fitness. In September 2023, he captained Bath for the first time as they secured a 29-23 victory away at Cornish Pirates in the Premiership Rugby Cup.

He captained Bath in the Premiership Rugby Cup during the 2024-25 season and was named in the Bath starting XV for his European Rugby Champions Cup debut against Benetton Rugby on 15 December 2024. He signed a new 24-month contract with Bath in February 2025. In March 2025, he was a try scorer in the final as Bath beat Exeter Chiefs 48-14 to win the 2024–25 Premiership Rugby Cup.

== International career ==
Richards played for the England U18 team as a 16 year-old and was a member of their tour to South Africa in the summer of 2019. He was part of the England Under-20 side that completed a grand slam in the 2021 Six Nations Under 20s Championship. During the competition he scored two tries in a game against Ireland and was ultimately voted players player. He also featured again in the 2022 U20 Six Nations.

In May 2022, Richards received his first call up to a senior England training camp. Richards was selected for the England A squad in November 2025 and made his first appearance for the side in a victory against Spain.

== Personal life ==
Richards is from a family of Bath Rugby fans. His father, Neil, was a coach at Tor RFC where Ewan started playing rugby at five years-old.
