= Church of St Andrew, Compton Dundon =

Church in Somerset, England

Church of St Andrew
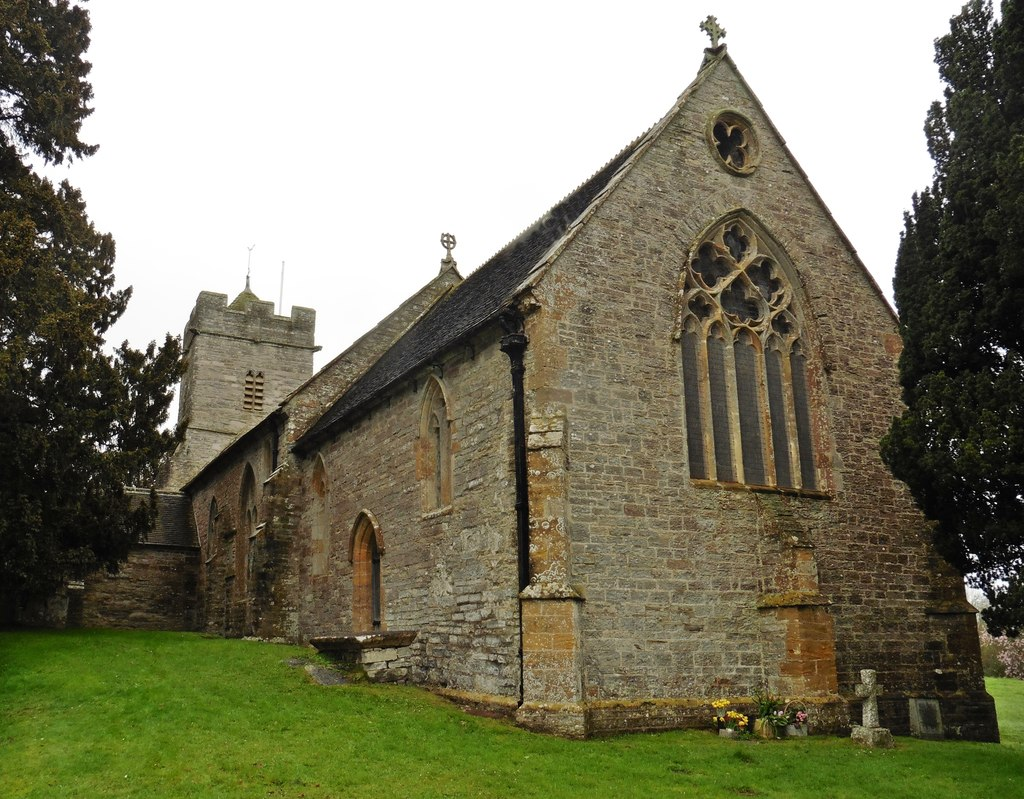

- Location within Somerset
- 51.0897°N 2.7447°W
- Location: Compton Dundon, Somerset, England

History
- Built: 11th century

Site notes
- Website: swcd-churches.org.uk/Groups/277513/St%20Andrews%20Compton.aspx

Listed Building – Grade II*
- Official name: Church of St Andrew
- Designated: 17 April 1959
- Reference no.: 1176782

The Anglican Church of St Andrew Compton Dundon, Somerset, England was built in the 14th century. It is a Grade II* listed building.

== History ==
The chancel of the church was built in the 14th century with the rest being added in the 15th. Restoration was carried out around 1900.

The parish is part of the benefice of Street with Walton and Compton Dundon within the Diocese of Bath and Wells.

== Architecture ==
The stone building has hamstone dressings and clay tile roofs. It consists of a four-bay nave and two-bay chancel with and south porch and north east vestry. The three-stage west tower is supported by corner buttresses.

The interior includes a 14th-century piscina and an octagonal timber pulpit dating from 1628. There are two chests one from the 14th and the other 16th century.

In the churchyard is an ancient yew tree, assessed as being over 1700 years old. The trunk of the tree is hollow and has a circumference of 23 feet (7.0 m).

There is also an 18th-century chest tomb.

== Bells ==
The church has a full circle ring of six bells and a separate tenor which is used for chiming, after a major renovation project finishing in 2025. The oldest two bells are dated 1630 and 1688 and were cast in the village by the Austen family; two other bells were recast in 1729 and 1777 by the Bilbie family. A 1796 bell cast by the Bilbie family was found not to be in tune with the others and is now used for the chimes of the clock. Two 19th-century bells were acquired from elsewhere: one from St James' Church, Church Kirk, Lancashire, and one from All Saints Church, Lindfield, Sussex, and a new steel frame was installed.

Historically the church had a ring of five bells. The mechanism needed repair by 1900 and in 1936 the bells were rehung to be used for chiming only.

== See also ==
- List of ecclesiastical parishes in the Diocese of Bath and Wells
