= Street Mission Church =

Church in Somerset, England

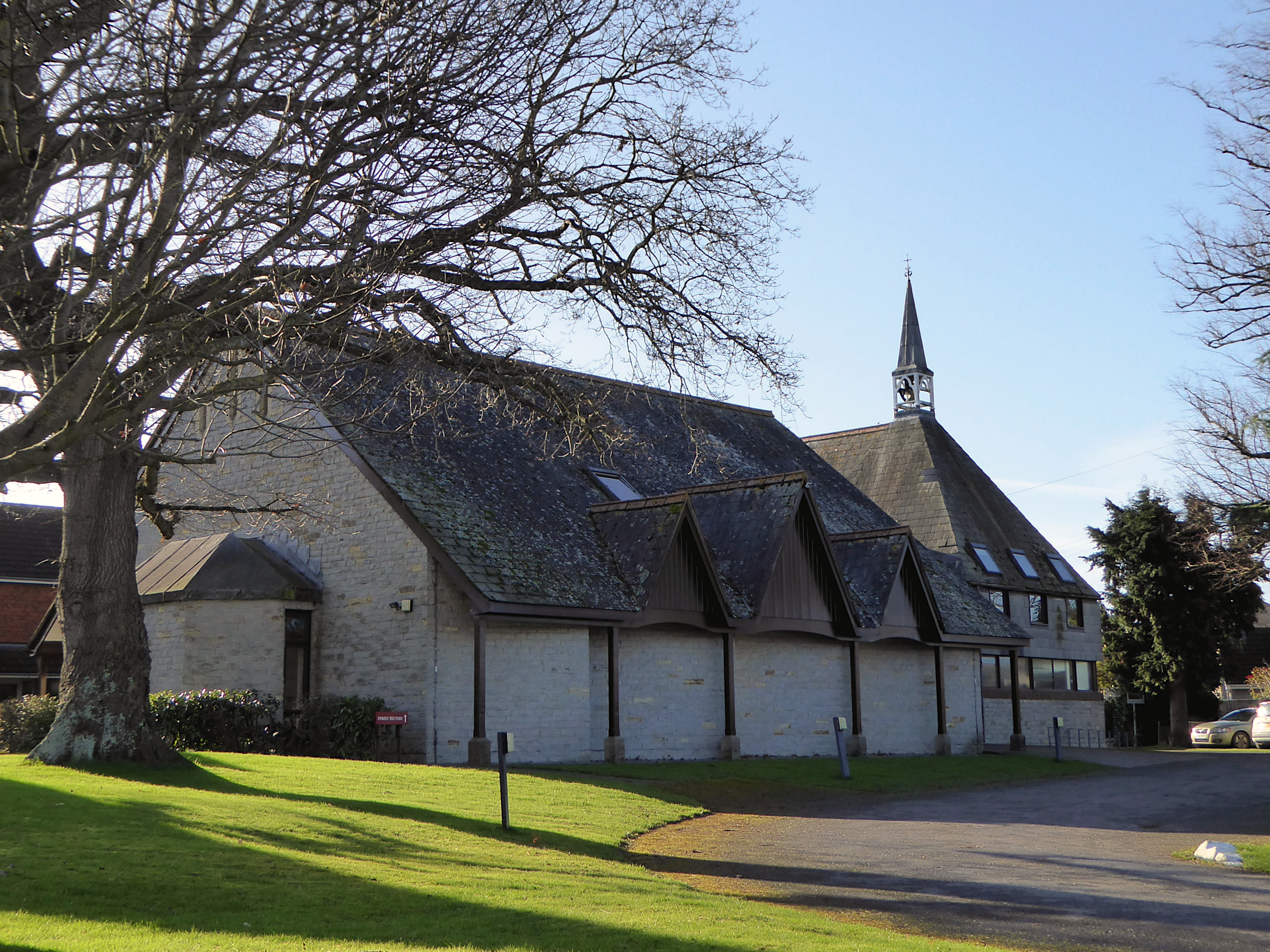
- Street Mission Church

Religion
- Affiliation: Church of England
- Ecclesiastical or organizational status: Active
- Year consecrated: 1990

Location
- Location: Street, Somerset, England
- Interactive map of Street Mission Church
- Coordinates: 51.1244°N 2.7414°W

Architecture
- Architect: Norman Cant
- Type: Church

Street Mission Church is a Church of England church in Street, Somerset, England. The church was built in 1990 on the site of an earlier tin tabernacle which had been in use since 1898.

== History ==
The Mission Church at Street was erected as a chapel of ease to the parish church of Holy Trinity. Owing to the expanding population of the town, efforts towards a new church, including fundraising, began during the incumbency of Rev. G. Beilby in the 1890s. His successor, Rev. H. L. Somers-Cocks, formulated his own scheme for a new church and rectory, and he established a Church Extension Committee to raise the estimated sum of £6,000. A plot of land was purchased for £650 as the proposed site for both buildings. In 1897, construction commenced on the rectory, the foundation stone of which was laid on 7 August by the Bishop of Adelaide, the Right Rev. John Harmer, brother-in-law of Street's rector. The building was completed the following year for an approximate cost of £1,800.

Despite the rectory's completion, funds remained too low for construction of the church to commence, prompting the rector to appeal to the Diocesan Church Building Society for a temporary iron church to be loaned to the parish until funds were sufficient. The purchase of an iron church for a maximum £300 was approved at a meeting of the Bath and Wells Diocesan Societies in 1897. It was then let to the rector and churchwardens of Street for 2.5% the cost of the church per year.

The iron church was erected on the site of the proposed permanent church and dedicated by the Bishop of Bath and Wells, the Right Rev. George Kennion, on 5 February 1898. By the time of its opening, the Church Extension Fund had reached approximately £1,800, £1,100 of which had been raised in the parish. An additional £700 was need to clear the debt of purchasing the land, building the rectory and erecting the iron church. In June 1898, the iron church was reported by the Wells Journal as having "already supplied a very urgent and pressing need in the rapidly increasing and important parish."

As funds did not allow the proposed permanent church to be built, the iron building served the parish through most of the 20th century. During the 1980s, the church began suffering structural issues and was in need of major repair work, prompting an appeal to be launched to raise funds for its replacement with a permanent building. The successful "Mission Possible" appeal raised an additional £100,000 for the existing funds. Plans for the new church were drawn up by Norman Cant and planning permission was approved in 1987. The final service in the iron church was held on 31 December 1989.

The foundation stone of the new £300,000 church was laid by the Bishop of Bath and Wells, the Right Rev. George Carey, on 29 March 1990. By this time, most of the required funds had been raised, made up of £105,000 from the sale of the mission rooms (formerly a school) and land on the western side of the site, £80,000 in legacies, £60,000 in donations and £25,000 from the diocese. The mission rooms were subsequently converted into two flats and the land used for the construction of two new dwellings.

The completed church was dedicated by the Bishop of Taunton, the Right Rev. Nigel McCulloch, on 7 November 1990, with assistance from the Archdeacon of Wells, the Ven. Ted Thomas. It was built using Blue Lias stone and incorporates the bellcote from the iron church, along with a number of furnishings and the organ. It has accommodation for 250 persons.
