= Great Breach and Copley Woods =

Protected area in Somerset, England

- Site of Special Scientific Interest
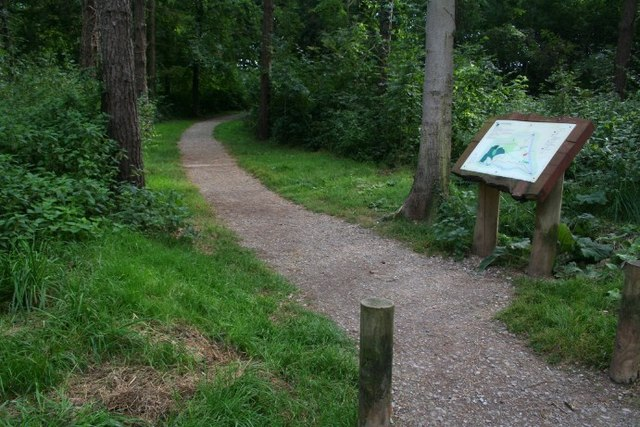

- Location within Somerset
- Location of Great Breach and Copley Woods.
- Area of search: Somerset
- Grid reference: ST500320
- Coordinates: 51.08513°N 2.71523°W
- Interest: Biological
- Area: 64.8 hectares (0.648 km^{2}; 0.250 sq mi)
- Notification date: 1972

Great Breach and Copley Woods (grid reference ST500320) is a 64.8 hectare (160 acre) biological Site of Special Scientific Interest 1 km south of Compton Dundon and 5 km south-east of Street in Somerset, England, notified in 1972.

== Description ==
Great Breach and Copley Woods is an area of ancient and semi-natural broadleaved woodland. it was largely planted in the 19th century as an oak plantation but was cleared and large parts of it were replanted with conifers. The site has two woodland types which have a restricted distribution in Britain. It has a locally important invertebrate fauna. The assemblage of fungi in the woods is also interesting. The site occupies a plateau and steep slopes which face west and is it the eastern end of the Polden Hills. The soils are poorly drained and lime rich and the underlying rock strata are Lower Lias and Keuper Marl.

== Flora and fauna ==
Great Breach and Copley Woods many nationally scarce species of invertebrates, an interesting ground flora more typical of ancient woodland sitesand over 600 species of fungi. Over 170 species which are scarce in Somerset have been recorded. For example, it is the only site in Britain where the fungus Lycophyllum konradianum has been recorded.

There are two areas of ancient woodland in the site, the dominant species of tree in Bunch Wood are ash and small-leaved lime this also has some field maple and hazel while in the southern part of the site there is an area of woodland dominated by alder and ash. The majority of what's left of the site was afforested in the early 19th century with pedunculate oak and ash. Despite their man-made origin these reafforested areas resemble ancient woodland, with a diverse understorey including wayfaring tree, guelder-rose, dogwood and spindle. The herb layer in these woods also has a community more typical of ancient woodland while the rides are also home to a rich group of plants including pyramidal orchid and greater butterfly-orchid.

These woods support a varied assemblage of invertebrates fauna and make up one of Somerset's most important sites for butterflies with 29 resident breeding species having been observed in recent years. One species of particular interest is the Duke of Burgundy. There is a varied moth fauna too which includes national rare species such as Ethmia terminella and Dystebenna stephensi. Other important invetbrates on the site include nationally rare species of hoverfly. The site also has a rich variety of grasshoppers, bees and other insects. The birds are typical British woodland species but lesser spotted woodpecker is found here.

== Management ==
The Somerset Wildlife Trust manage the site and have been working to remove non native conifers and beech which adversely affect the sites nature conservation value, allowing natural regeneration which leads to an increase in light reaching the woodland floor. They also maintain the extensive network of open rides and glades, which allow wildlife and people to travel within the woods.

== History and archaeology ==
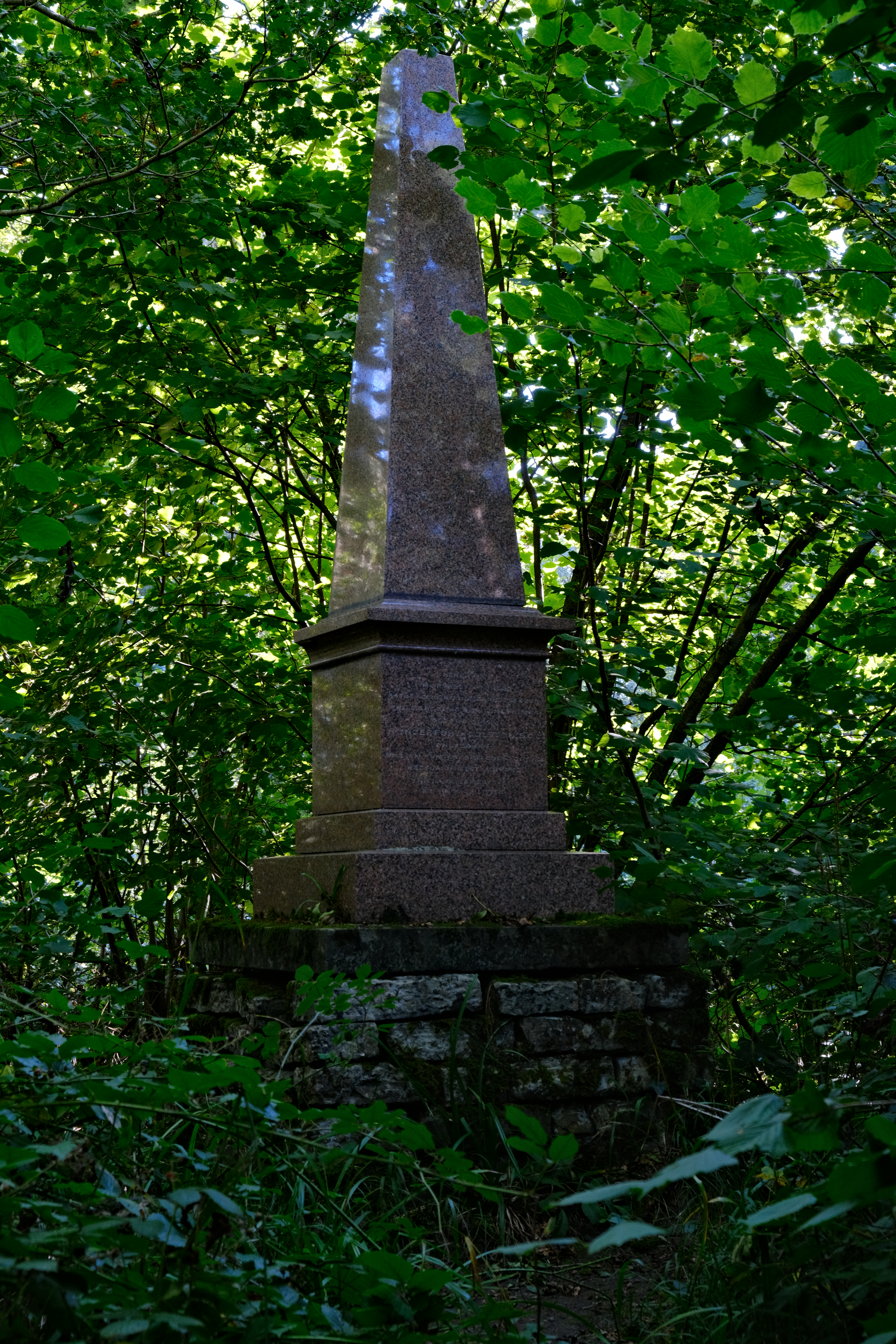
The Colston obelisk.

Copley House stood amongst the woods here but has long been demolished. Parts of the site were used as a training camp during the Second World War but signs of this have almost vanished. The Colston Obelisk, a Listed Monument, in memorial to a Rector's son killed in a hunting accident in 1852, is situated in the woods.
