= Walton and Ivythorn Hills =

Hills in Somerset, England

- Site of Special Scientific Interest
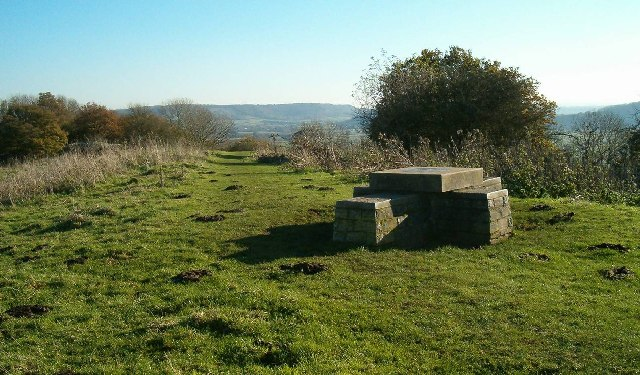

- Location within Somerset
- Location of Walton and Ivythorn Hills.
- Area of search: Somerset
- Grid reference: ST475346
- Coordinates: 51.10828°N 2.75129°W
- Interest: Biological
- Area: 34.9 hectares (0.349 km^{2}; 0.135 sq mi)
- Notification date: 1953

Walton and Ivythorn Hills is a 34.9 hectares (86 acres) biological Site of Special Scientific Interest near Street at the south-eastern end of the Polden Hills in the English county of Somerset. Walton Hill is south of the village of Walton, and Ivythorn Hill is south of Street. Notified in 1953, the site is now owned and managed by the National Trust who acquired the freehold in 1988.

The hills which rise to 80 metres (260 ft) above Ordnance datum (mean sea level) are made up of limestone, rheatic clay and Keuper marl covered with calcareous grassland, scrubland and coppiced woodland. A quarry existed in the Middle Ages. This supports a variety of Butterflies, Leafhoppers, Spiders, Soldier Flies and Great Green Bush Crickets living on the vegetation. Notable buildings include Ivythorne Manor, which was originally built for Glastonbury Abbey, Walton windmill and a small sanatorium which became the first youth hostel in Somerset. In 1977 a short lived hippie camp was set up on Ivythorne Hill. The camp was a Free Festival to celebrate 7/7/77. The festival was attended by an estimated 3,000 people and was basically a one-day affair, with some people arriving early and the hangers on eventually evicted by the council.

== Geography ==
The Polden Hills a long, low ridge, extending for 10 miles (16 km), and separated from the Mendip Hills, to which they are nearly parallel, by a marshy tract, known as the Somerset Levels. The ridge is underlain by Blue Lias with alternating strata of limestone, rheatic clay and Keuper marl.

At the highest point on Walton Hill, which reaches 80 metres (260 ft) above Ordnance datum (mean sea level), there is a topograph or orientation stone used as a triangulation point and highlighting key features of the surrounding landscape including the Somerset Levels and the Admiral Hood Monument. It forms the starting point for the 6 miles (9.7 km) long footpath known as the Polden Way.

== History ==
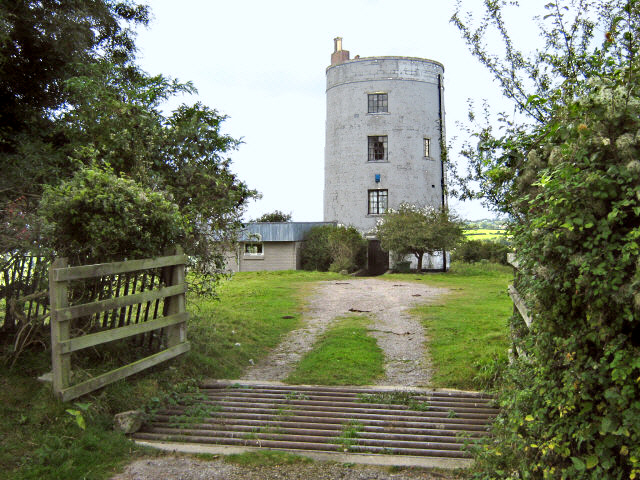
Walton windmill

A quarry on Ivythorn Hill produced stone for Street Manor in 1403. Ivythorne Manor is a Grade II* listed building which was built as a monastic dwelling in the medieval era and rebuilt in 1488 by John Selwood, Abbot of Glastonbury Abbey. It later became a country house and was revised and extended from the 16th to 20th centuries by the Marshall and Sydenham families which owned it. Within the grounds is a dovecote which was probably built around 1578 for John Sydenham.

Walton windmill on Walton Hill was described as "new-erected" in 1741, although there had been a mill erected on the site in 1342. It was worked until 1906. It is now a Grade II listed building and private residence. There was also a windmill on Ivythorne Hill.

The shoe manufacturer C. & J. Clark, through the Society of Friends, had a small sanatorium and convalescent home on Ivythorn Hill overlooking Street. In 1931, this chalet style building was leased to the Youth Hostel Association and became the first youth hostel in Somerset. It is still used for this purpose.

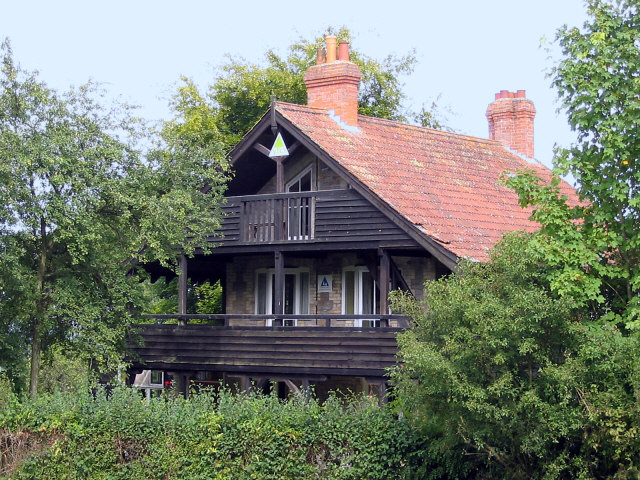
The youth hostel

This site is owned and managed by the National Trust. They acquired the freehold of 0.248 hectares (0.61 acres) of Ivythorn Hill in 1988 from Street Estates, which followed 16.606 hectares (41.03 acres) of Walton Hill in 1940 from Polden Farms Ltd and the initial 18.751 hectares (46.33 acres) of Ivythorn Hill and Wood in 1919 from Baron St Audries.

In 1977 Ivythorne Hill was the site of a hippie camp following summer solstice celebrations at Stonehenge. They were evicted by Mendip District Council.

== Ecology ==
Walton and Ivythorn Hills are covered by a variety of semi-natural habitats. These include unimproved calcareous grassland, scrubland and coppiced woodland including field maple and Ash. The range of habitats are home to many species of invertebrate. Butterflies, Leafhoppers, Spiders and Soldier Flies are particularly well represented. There is also a population of Great Green Bush Cricket (Tettigonia viridissima).

Between 2011 and 2013 a project was undertaken to increase the population of Large blue butterflies on the Polden Hills. This included planting Wild Thyme and managing the grazing on Walton Hill.
