= Holton, Somerset =

Village and civil parish in Somerset, England

Coordinates: 51.039918°N 2.448879°W

Holton
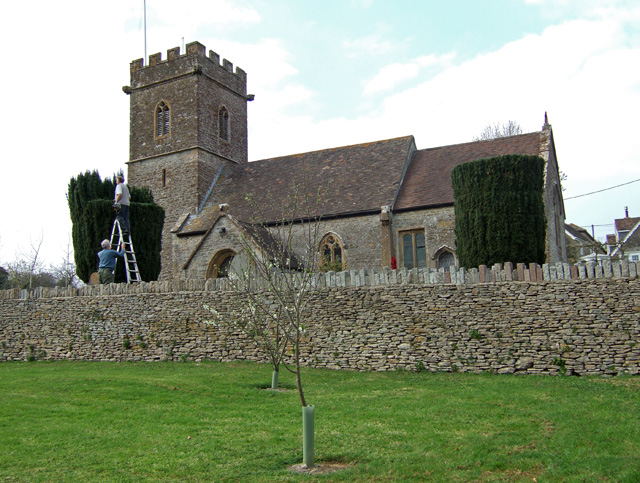
- Church of St Nicholas, Holton

- Location within Somerset
- Population: 238 (2011)
- OS grid reference: ST686268
- Unitary authority: Somerset Council
- Ceremonial county: Somerset
- Region: South West
- Country: England
- Sovereign state: United Kingdom
- Post town: Wincanton
- Postcode district: BA9
- Police: Avon and Somerset
- Fire: Devon and Somerset
- Ambulance: South Western
- UK Parliament: Glastonbury and Somerton

Holton is a village (or hamlet) and parish in Somerset, England, situated on the A303 road 2 miles (3.2 km) south west of Wincanton. The village has a population of 238.

== History ==
The parish of Holton was part of the Whitley Hundred.

The route of the A303 has been changed a couple of times. The oldest route passes through the centre of the village past the Old Inn, and is a narrow lane. The village was bypassed by a new route a hundred yards to the north, and has since been bypassed again by the creation of a dual carriageway a few yards further north. To reach Holton it is necessary to leave the modern A303 at Wincanton (2 miles to the east) or, if arriving from the west, leave at Blackford (1 mile to the west), then join the older route.

== Governance ==
The parish council has responsibility for local issues, including setting an annual precept (local rate) to cover the council’s operating costs and producing annual accounts for public scrutiny. The parish council evaluates local planning applications and works with the local police, district council officers, and neighbourhood watch groups on matters of crime, security, and traffic. The parish council's role also includes initiating projects for the maintenance and repair of parish facilities, as well as consulting with the district council on the maintenance, repair, and improvement of highways, drainage, footpaths, public transport, and street cleaning. Conservation matters (including trees and listed buildings) and environmental issues are also the responsibility of the council.

For local government purposes, since 1 April 2023, the parish comes under the unitary authority of Somerset Council. Prior to this, it was part of the non-metropolitan district of South Somerset (established under the Local Government Act 1972). It was part of Wincanton Rural District before 1974.

It is also part of the Glastonbury and Somerton county constituency represented in the House of Commons of the Parliament of the United Kingdom. It elects one Member of Parliament (MP) by the first past the post system of election.

== Religious sites ==
The parish Church of St Nicholas dates from the 14th century and has been designated as a Grade II* listed building.
