= Edwin Edwards (organist) =

British academic and organist

Edwin Edwards (1830–1907) FRCO (Fellow of the Royal College of Organists), was from 1867 until 1886 the Director of Music and Organist at Rugby School, Warwickshire, England.

Edwards was born in Street, Somerset in 1830. Prior to the post at Rugby, Edwards was organist to the Duke of Buccleuch in Dalkeith, Scotland.

He is most widely remembered for his psalm chant in F (Parish Psalter 69, Psalm 25, Ad te, Domine, levavi). But Edwards, who was Editor of the Rugby School Hymn Book, also published music for the organ including a March in G (1881), a one-movement Sonata in E minor (Sonata da Chiesa), which appeared in The Organist's Quarterly Journal Part 62, in 1884., and an Introduction and Fugue in C, first appearing in The Organist's Quarterly Journal, Part 99, in 1893, being re-issued in 1898, under the title Prelude and Fugue, in The Anglican Organist, Vol 15.

The Introduction and Fugue in C and the Sonata da Chiesa are recently republished.

A photograph of Edwin Edwards appears in Windows on Warwickshire.

A Musical Times article (1905) on music at Rugby refers to the "zealous labours" of Mr Edwin Edwards, "former music-master". After twenty two years at the school, it states, he "remained still a highly respected resident in the town." He is listed elsewhere as having conducted the choir of Rugby School in 1867–86, just short of two decades. He died at Rugby in 1907.
