= Street Methodist Church =

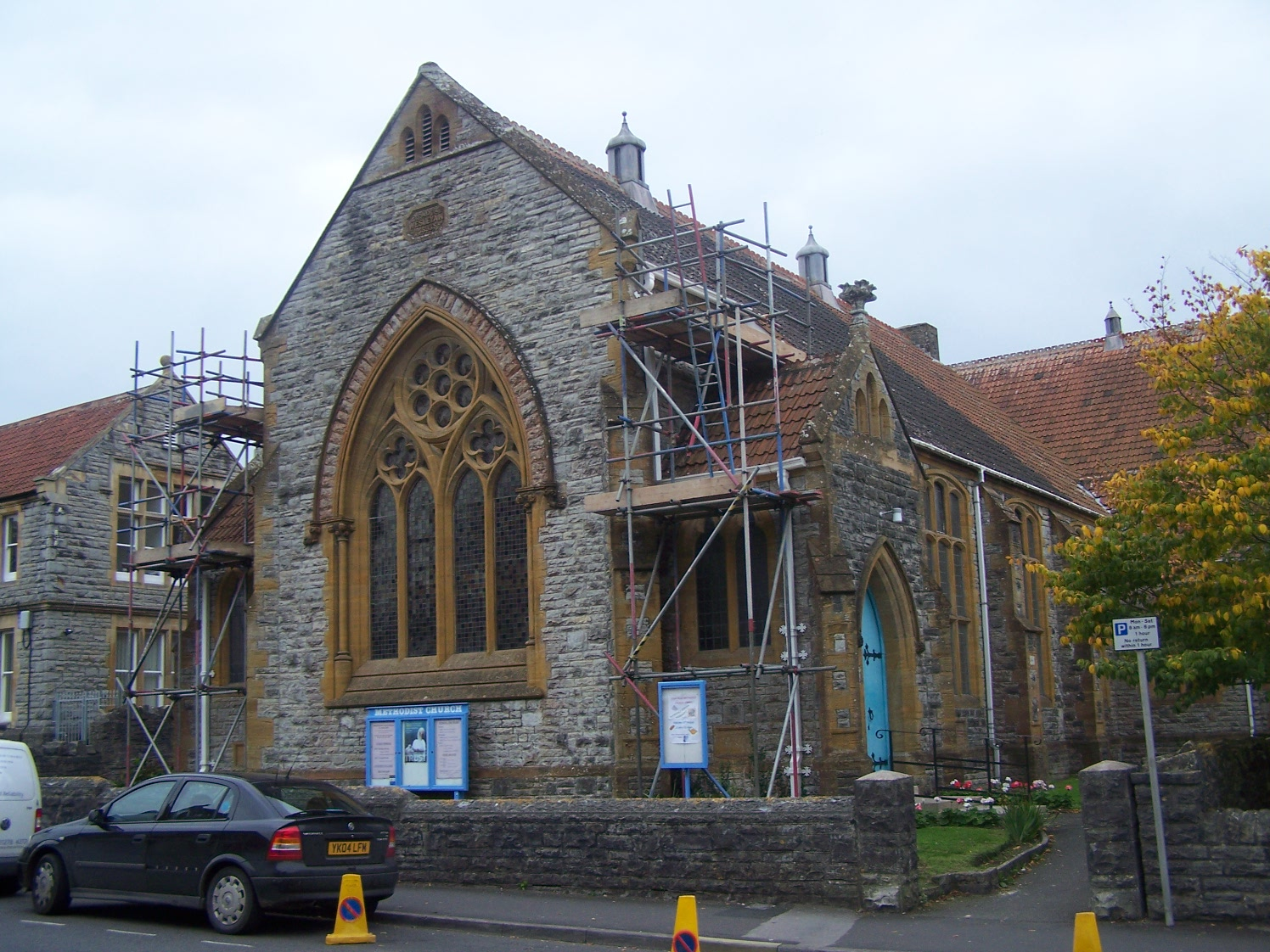

Religion
- Affiliation: Methodist
- Ecclesiastical or organizational status: Active

Location
- Location: Street, Somerset, England
- Interactive map of Street Methodist Church
- Coordinates: 51.1259°N 2.7388°W

Architecture
- Architects: Henry Hawkins and George Alves
- Type: Church
- Style: Gothic
- Completed: 1893

Street Methodist Church is a Methodist church in Street, Somerset, England. It was designed by Henry Hawkins and George Alves and built in 1893.

== History ==
A Methodist following was established in Street in the early 19th-century, with houses licensed in 1806 and 1812 likely to have been used for Methodist worship. Further houses were licensed until 1839 when the first Wesleyan chapel was built on land donated by Mr. Cyrus Clark in Goswell Road. As congregation and Sunday school numbers grew, the chapel was enlarged a number of times, including in 1854.

As the end of the 19th-century approached, the chapel remained inadequate in serving the local Wesleyan circuit. When Mr. W. S. Clark gifted a plot of land in Leigh Road, discussions held at the beginning of 1893 resolved to build a new chapel. A £2,700 scheme was proposed, which included a new chapel, schoolroom and vestries. The architectural plans were drawn up by Messrs Henry Hawkins and George Alves of Glastonbury free of charge. Owing to the large cost of the scheme, it was decided to build the chapel and vestry rooms first, with the old chapel to be used as a schoolroom until the new one could be built.

The new chapel and vestry rooms were built by Mr. J. Pursey of Street for an approximate cost of £1,450, with the architects supervising the work. 27 memorial stones were laid on 27 April 1893, with the central stone being laid by Mrs. F. J. Clark. By this time, £450 of the estimated £1,860 cost had been raised.

The chapel was opened by Rev. H. J. Pope, the president of the Wesleyan Conference, on 14 December 1893. By the time of its opening, £1,115 had been raised or promised. Mr. C. White covered the cost of transferring the organ from the old chapel to the new one. The proposed two-storey schoolroom was added in 1895–96, which included an assembly hall and ten classrooms. It was built by Mr. William Withers for £655.

== Architecture ==
The church is built of Blue Lias stone, with Hamstone dressings and a clay pantile roof. It was designed to accommodate 380 persons.
