= Hundred of Whitley =

Historical Hundred of Somerset, England

Whitley Hundred
- Area
- 49,640 acres (20,090 ha)
- Status: Hundred
- Subdivisions
  - Type: Parishes
  - Units: Ashcott, Blackford, Butleigh, Compton Dundon, Cossington, Greinton, High Ham, Holford, Holton, Middlezoy, West Monkton, Moorlinch, Othery, Milton Podimore, Shapwick, Street, Walton, Westonzoyland, Wheathill, and Woolavington

The Hundred of Whitley is one of the 40 historical Hundreds in the ceremonial county of Somerset, England, dating from before the Norman conquest during the Anglo-Saxon era although exact dates are unknown. Each hundred had a 'fyrd', which acted as the local defence force and a court which was responsible for the maintenance of the frankpledge system. They also formed a unit for the collection of taxes. The role of the hundred court was described in the Dooms (laws) of King Edgar. The name of the hundred was normally that of its meeting-place.

It got its name from Whitley wood in Walton. Two previous units Loxley and Ringoldsway were merged to form Whitley Hundred in the 12th century.

The Hundred of Whitley consisted of the ancient parishes of: Ashcott, Blackford, Butleigh, Compton Dundon, Cossington, Greinton, High Ham, Holford, Holton, Middlezoy, West Monkton, Moorlinch, Othery, Milton Podimore, Shapwick, Street, Walton, Westonzoyland, Wheathill, and Woolavington as well as covering King's Sedgemoor. It covered an area of 49,640 acres (20,090 ha).

The importance of the hundred courts declined from the seventeenth century. By the 19th century several different single-purpose subdivisions of counties, such as poor law unions, sanitary districts, and highway districts sprang up, filling the administrative role previously played by parishes and hundreds. Although the Hundreds have never been formally abolished, their functions ended with the establishment of county courts in 1867 and the introduction of districts by the Local Government Act 1894.
