= Crispin School =

Crispin School Academy
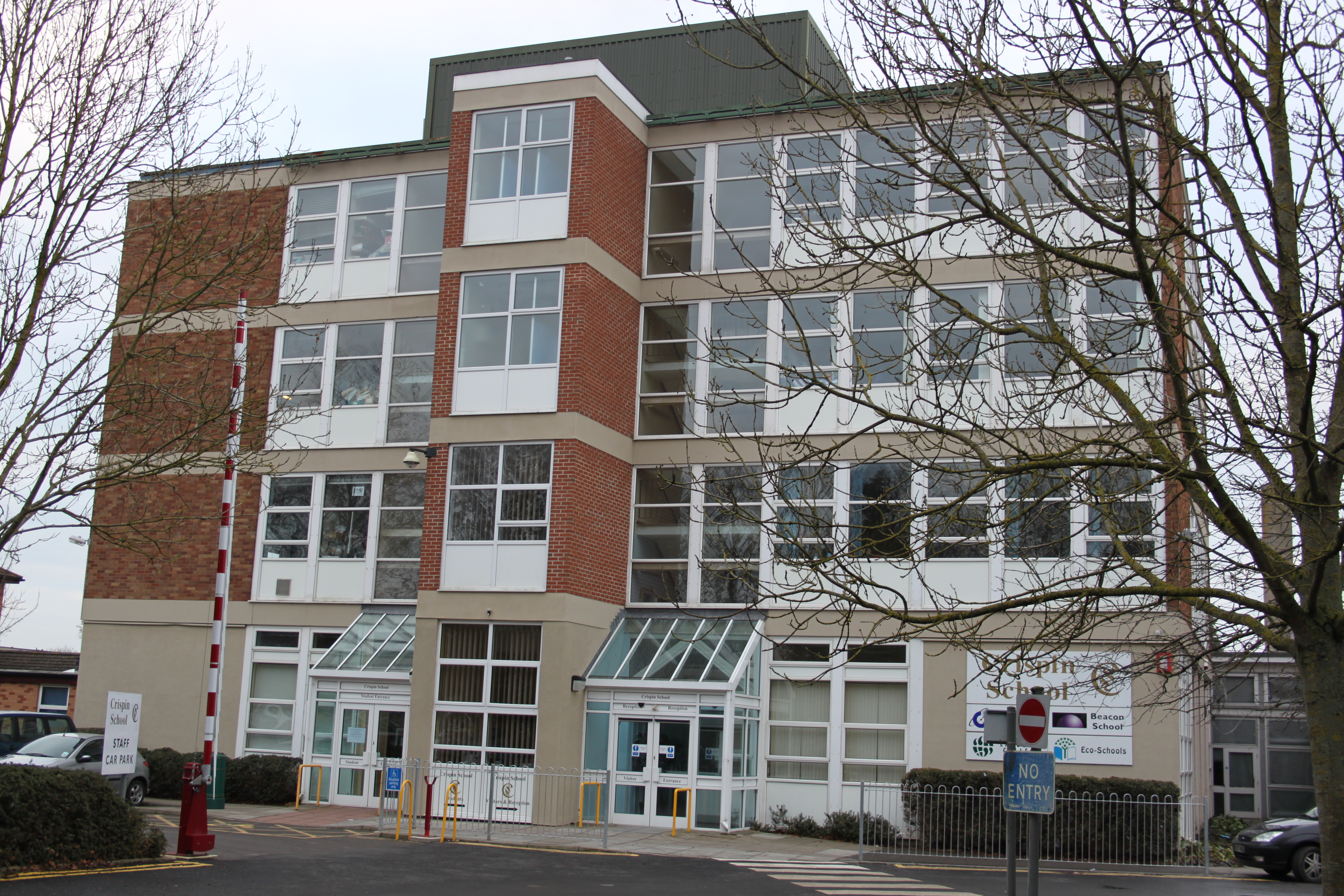

Location
- Church Road; Street, Somerset, BA16 0AD; England; 51.1303°N 2.7324°W

Information
- Type: Secondary Academy
- Motto: Aspiration – Compassion – Excellence
- Established: 1963; 63 years ago
- Specialist: Technology College, Language College
- Department for Education URN: 136913 Tables
- Ofsted: Reports
- Head: Paul Reddick
- Age: 11 to 16
- Enrollment: 1,040 pupils (as of May 2014)
- Houses: Corvus, Falco, Sturnus, Tyto
- Colours: Red, Blue, Green, Purple
- Website: www.crispinschool.co.uk

Crispin School Academy is a secondary school in Street, Somerset. The school is at the eastern end of Street and shares a campus with Strode College.

== History ==
Crispin School was formed in 1973 by the merger of Elmhurst Grammar School and Strode Secondary Modern School. In 1999, the school was awarded specialist technology status. A second specialism in music was awarded in 2008.

Crispin School was converted to an academy in 2011, under the provisions of the Academies Act 2010.

== Extracurricular activities ==
Students may participate in daily musical activities such as the school choir, senior choir, orchestra, and string group. Crispin School also participates in an Annual Carol Service at Wells Cathedral, a joint Christmas Concert with Brookside Academy, a Spring Concert, and School of Rock Days.

Annual trips take place to galleries in London, Bristol Zoo, and the Eden Project. Several residential trips take place, including ones to Iceland, France, Italy, New York, Swaziland, and Kenya. Crispin has a link with a school in Kenya and the 'Masana Block' is named in recognition of this link.

School shows are performed at the nearby Strode Theatre. Recent productions include Tales of the Arabian Nights (2016), Oliver (2017), Alice (2018), Find Me (2018), Bugsy Malone (2019), and Sister Act (2020).

Over the past six years, more than 90% of art and photography students at Crispin School have received GCSE scores of A*-C/4-9 In 2023, approximately half of the student body is studying Art and/or Photography.

== Houses ==
In 2019, the school introduced a House system with 10 vertical tutor groups in each House. These Houses are Corvus, Falco, Sturnus and Tyto, with the names being derived from various bird genera. Each House has a Head of House, a House Learning Coordinator, and a House Captain, the latter being voted in by staff and students with the House. The school hosts weekly competitions for students to compete in on behalf of their Houses, such as spelling bees and tug of war.

== Alumni ==
- Beccy Huxtable, radio personality and producer
- Jaye Jacobs, actress in Holby City, former deputy head girl of Crispin
