= Church of St Nicholas, Holton =

Church in Somerset, England

Church of St Nicholas
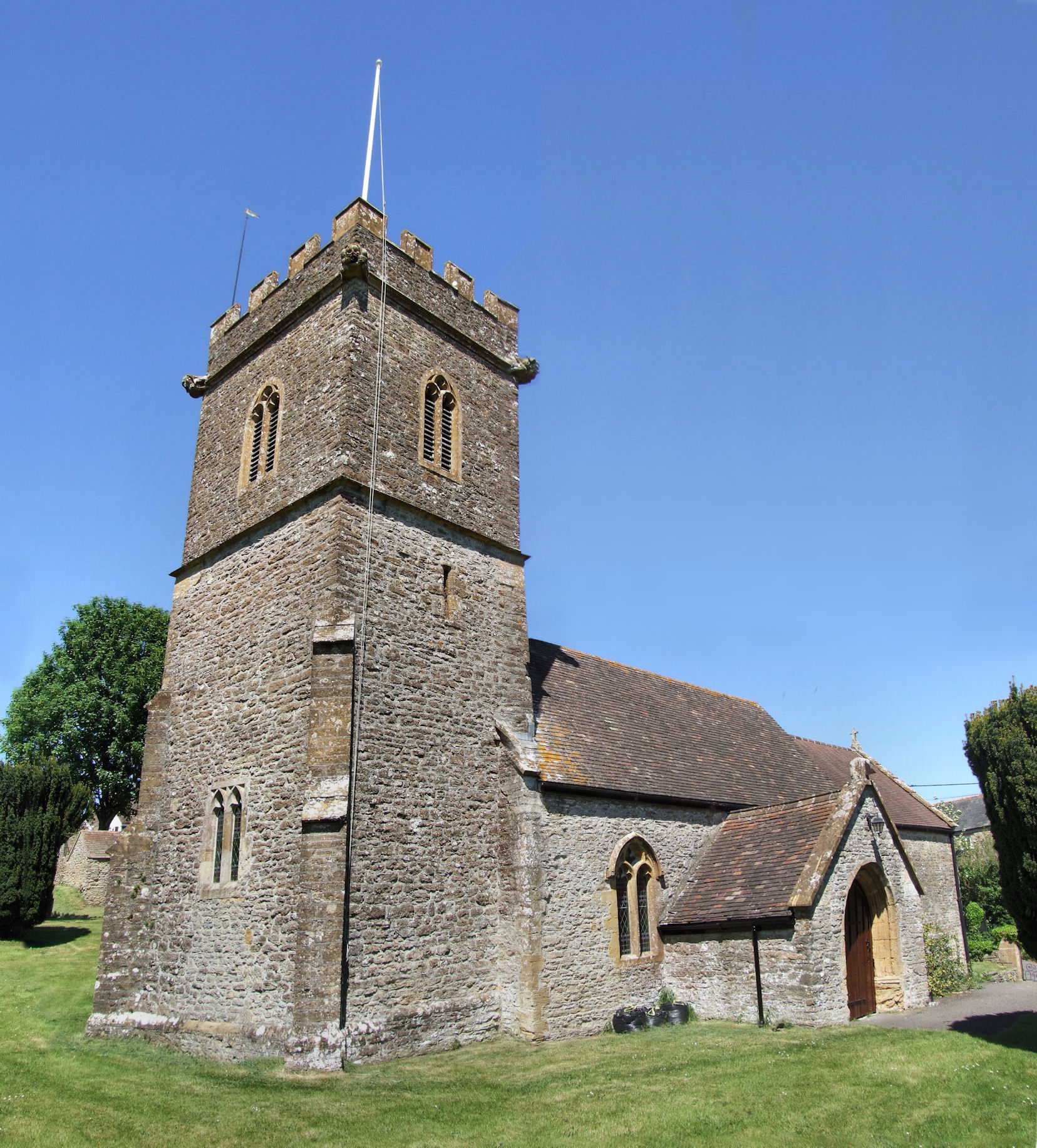

- Location within Somerset
- 51.0401°N 2.4503°W
- Location: Holton, Somerset, England

History
- Built: 14th century

Listed Building – Grade II*
- Official name: Church of St Nicholas
- Designated: 24 March 1961
- Reference no.: 1056348

The Anglican Church of St Nicholas in Holton, Somerset, England was built in the 14th century. It is a Grade II* listed building.

== History ==
The church was built in the 14th century and later added to. The north aisle was added in the 18th century.

The parish is part of the Camelot parishes benefice within the Diocese of Bath and Wells.

== Architecture ==
The stone building has Welsh slate roofs. It consists of a tow-bay nave and two-bay chancel with a north aisle, with vestry, and a south porch. The two-stage west tower is supported by diagonal buttresses. The tower has three bells, the oldest of which was cast around 1420.

The interior fittings include an octagonal 15th century pulpit and font believed to be from the 12th century.

== See also ==
- List of ecclesiastical parishes in the Diocese of Bath and Wells
