= United Reformed Church, Street =

Church in Somerset, England

United Reformed Church
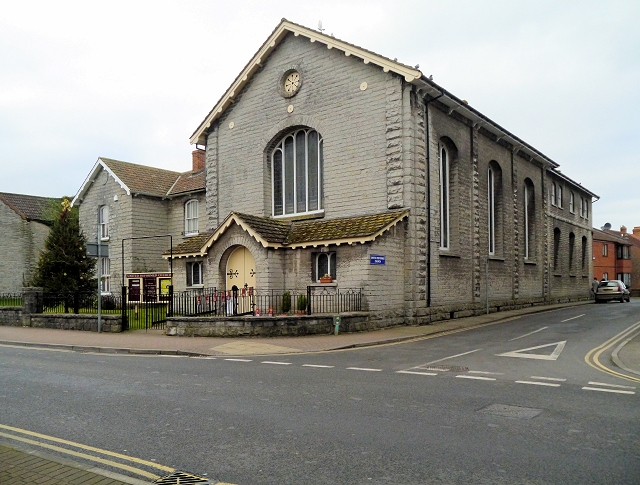

Religion
- Affiliation: United Reformed Church

Location
- Location: Street, Somerset, England
- Interactive map of United Reformed Church
- Coordinates: 51.1256°N 2.7424°W

Architecture
- Architect: Samuel Pollard
- Type: Church
- Completed: 1855

The United Reformed Church (originally known as the Congregational Chapel) is a United Reformed Church in Street, Somerset, England. It was designed by Samuel Pollard and built in 1854–55.

== History ==
Independent worship began in Street in 1798, when part of a house was briefly used as a place of worship. A new following was formed in 1852, with Sunday services held at the Temperance Hall, often by ministers from Taunton and Bristol. Street's congregation officially formed as a church on 3 September 1853. As the Temperance Hall quickly became too small to hold the growing congregation, fundraising began for a purpose-built chapel. A plot of land was donated by Messrs C. & J. Clark and plans for a chapel capable of seating 400 people were drawn up by Samuel Pollard of Taunton.

Mr. Samuel Petvin of Street was hired as the builder and the foundation stone was laid by Mr. Thomas Simpson of Manchester on 8 August 1854. The chapel, which cost approximately £500 to build, opened for Divine service on 29 May 1855. A sermon was preached by Rev. H. Addiscott of Taunton in the morning and Rev. H. Quick of Taunton preached in the evening. By the time of its opening, approximately £120 of its cost was left to raised.

A schoolroom was added in 1866 and the chapel enlarged and provided with new seating in 1874. The schoolroom was later rebuilt at a cost of £600, with opening services held on 1 March 1885.

The church remains active as part of the Mid Somerset URC Group.
