= Catherine Impey =

English Quaker activist (1847–1923)

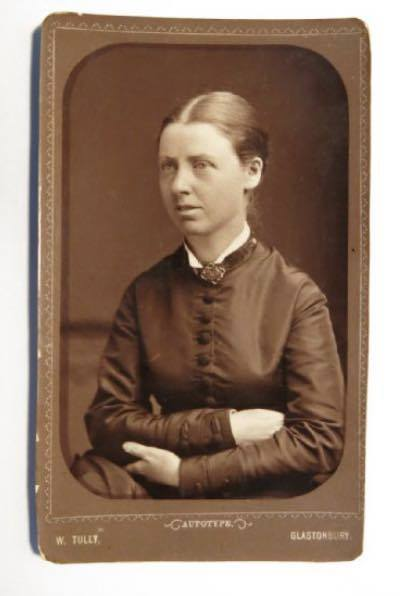
- Born: 13 August 1847; Street, Somerset, England
- Died: 14 December 1923 (aged 76); Street, Somerset, England
- Other name: Katie Impey
- Occupations: Activist; editor
- Known for: Temperance and anti-racist activism
- Notable work: Anti-Caste (1888–1895)

Catherine "Katie" Impey (13 August 1847 – 14 December 1923) was an English Quaker activist for temperance and against racial discrimination. She was the founder and editor of the anti-racist journal Anti-Caste (1888–1895).

== Biography ==
=== Early life ===
Impey was born into a Quaker family on 13 August 1847 in Street, Somerset, to Robert Impey (1820–1886), a farmer who formerly worked as a tanner, and Mary Hannah Impey (née Clothier; 1823–1895). She went by the name Katie.

She and her sister Ellen received a Quaker education at Southside House, in nearby Weston-super-Mare. The school required all graduating students to embark on a philanthropic endeavour; Catherine and her sister elected to "help remove oppression among the darker races of the world."

=== Activism ===
==== Temperance ====
Impey was a lifelong teetotaller and made advocating temperance part of her life's work. She was a member of the Street Teetotal Society, the British Women's Temperance Association, and the International Order of Good Templars.

==== Anti-racism ====
Impey founded Britain's first anti-racist journal, Anti-Caste, in March 1888 and edited it until its last edition in 1895. In the first issue, she wrote:

When the curse of negro slavery lay upon the Southland, when it means danger and even death to agitate against it, and philanthropy was ever busy upon the thousand social evils of the day; when men who were timid or indifferent begged to be let alone – there came from the young man William Lloyd Garrison those grand words that are now engraved upon his monument at Boston: "I am in earnest, I will not equivocate, I will not retreat a single inch, and I will be heard."

The journal was inspired by Booker T. Washington's Southern Letter. Impey visited the United States several times from 1878 and the journal focused largely on issues in America. In 1893, she co-founded the Society for the Recognition of the Universal Brotherhood of Man, with the American civil rights activist and former slave Ida B. Wells, who visited the UK to campaign against the lynching of black Americans.

=== Travels ===
Impey made her first trip to the United States in March 1878 when a schizm in the Good Templars over the issue of integration led to the formation of the Right Worthy Grand Lodge (RWGL). A Good Templar lodge in the US state of Kentucky wanted to join the International Order of Good Templars (IOGT), but refused to admit black people as members, whereas the IOGT in England was already integrated. The IOGT decided to permit segregated lodges and the British group split off in protest, forming the RWGL. That year, Impey was named the RWGL's Secretary of the Negro Mission for the United States and sent her to Boston to attend the RWGL conference held in Boston's Pythian Hall.

=== Personal life and death ===
Impey became a vegetarian in 1879. Her sister died in 1921. After a short illness, Impey died at her home in Street on 14 December 1923.

== See also ==
- Alfred Webb
