= Strode College =

Location
- Church Road, Street, Somerset, BA16 0AB, United Kingdom; 51.1305°N 2.7340°W

Information
- Former names: Street Technical College (1963–1973)
- Established: 1973
- Local authority: Somerset Council
- Department for Education URN: 130806 Tables
- Ofsted: Reports
- Head teacher: Sam Reilly
- Gender: mixed
- Age range: 16+
- Student Union/Association: Strode College Students' Union
- Color: Teal
- Website: https://www.strodecollege.ac.uk

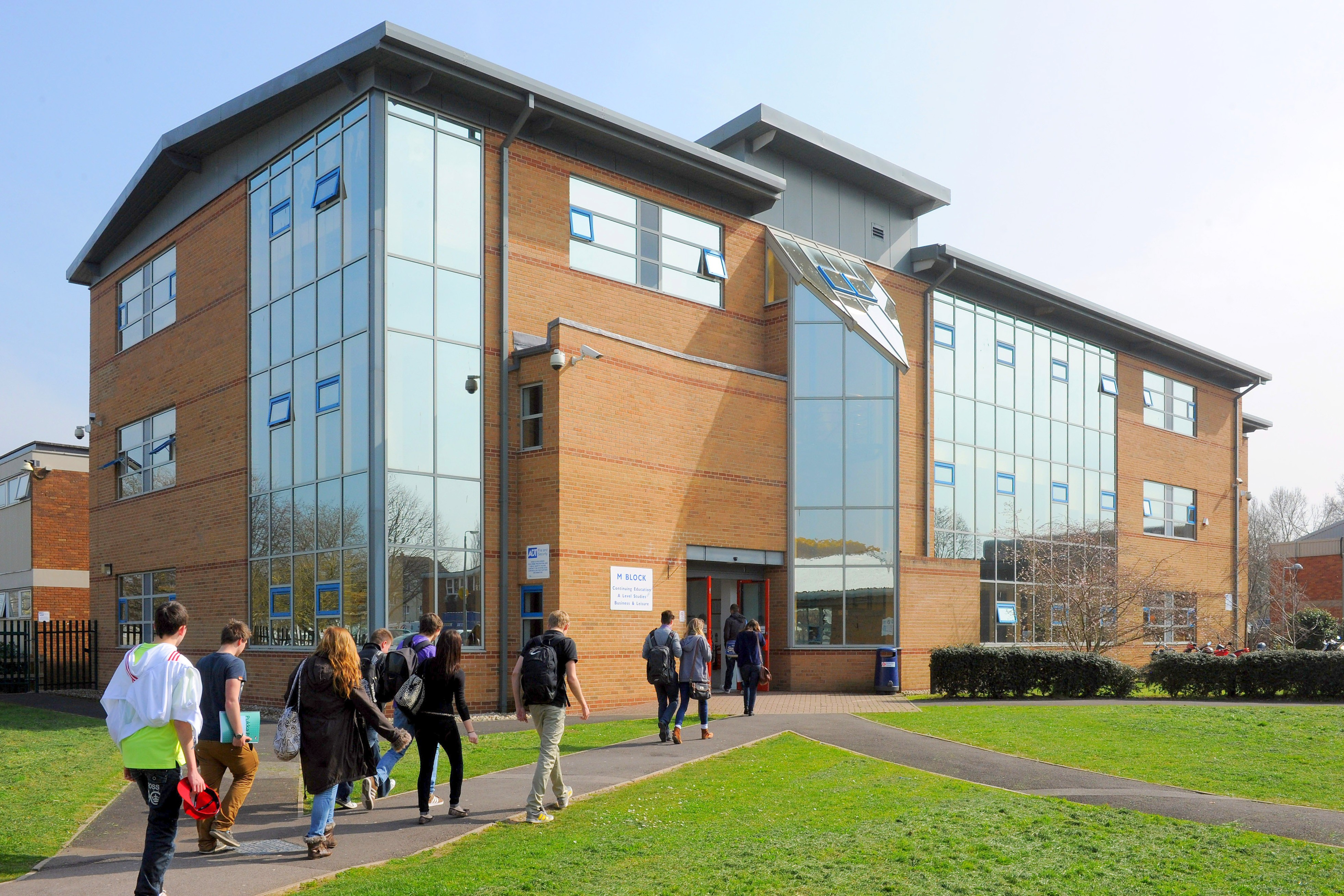
Strode College Campus

Strode College is a further education & higher education college situated in Street, Somerset, England and a constituent college of the University Centre Somerset College Group. Its campus surrounds Crispin secondary school and the local Strode theatre.

== Ofsted inspection ==
Strode College was inspected by Ofsted in October 2022 and received an overall judgement of "Good". The inspection found the quality of education, leadership and management, personal development, adult learning programmes, education programmes for young people, and apprenticeship provision to be "Good". Behaviour and attitudes were rated "Outstanding". Provision for learners with high needs was judged to require improvement.

The inspection was the first full inspection since the previous overall judgement of "Outstanding", with inspectors noting areas of strength alongside recommendations for improvement in provision for learners with high needs.

== Foundations and pre-modern origins ==
The origins of Strode College can be traced to the establishment of Street Technical School in 1899 on Leigh Road, Street, Somerset. The school was founded by William Stephens Clark, a member of the Clark family associated with the local shoe manufacturer C&J Clark, to provide technical and leisure education for the local community. It developed from earlier evening classes in Street, which had offered instruction in subjects including art, geology and agriculture from the 1870s.

The Technical School initially provided a range of evening classes and vocational education, reflecting the wider expansion of technical education in England during the late 19th and early 20th centuries. Subjects offered included practical and academic courses designed to support local employment and community learning.

The institution continued to operate as Street Technical School until the mid-20th century. In 1962 the school closed, with students transferring to the newly established Street Technical College, which opened in 1963 on the current college site.

== Development as Strode College (1963–2025) ==
Street Technical College opened in 1963 on the present Church Road site, following the closure of Street Technical School in 1962. The new college continued the provision of technical and further education in the local area.

In 1973, the college adopted the name Strode College. The name was derived from William Strode of Barrington Court, a 17th-century local benefactor associated with educational foundations in the area. During this period, the college expanded its role in providing post-16 education to students from Street and surrounding communities.

Following the expansion of further education in England during the late 20th century, Strode developed into a tertiary college, providing a combination of academic, vocational and adult education programmes. By the 1990s, the college offered a broad curriculum including A levels, vocational qualifications and adult learning provision.

During the early 21st century, Strode College continued to develop its curriculum and facilities, expanding provision in areas including sixth-form education, technical qualifications, apprenticeships and higher education. Until 2025, it operated as an independent further education corporation serving students from across Somerset.

== University Centre Somerset College Group (2025–present) ==
University Centre Somerset College Group (UCS College Group) was formed on 1 August 2025 through the merger of Bridgwater & Taunton College and Strode College. The merger followed a public consultation process in early 2025 and resulted in the creation of a single further education corporation serving Somerset.

The new college group brought together Bridgwater College,Cannington College, Taunton College, Strode College and University Centre Somerset, the group's higher education division. While operating under a shared governance structure, the individual colleges retained their local identities and continued to serve their existing communities.

The formation of UCS College Group created one of the largest further education groups in England, bringing together further education, apprenticeships, technical training and higher education provision across Somerset. The group stated that its purpose was to expand educational opportunities, strengthen partnerships with employers and support regional economic development.

Following the merger, Strode College continued to operate as a named college within UCS College Group, retaining its campus in Street and its role as a provider of sixth-form and further education courses for the local area.

== Performance ==
Strode College has historically achieved strong academic outcomes across its A level and vocational programmes. In 2019, A level entries achieved a 99% overall pass rate, with 62% of grades awarded at A*–B and 87% awarded at A*–C. The college reported that 91% of A level subjects achieved a 100% pass rate.

Level 3 vocational programmes also recorded high achievement levels, with 85% of students achieving at least their minimum target grade in 2019. The college reported particularly strong outcomes in some subject areas, including Engineering and Business, where a high proportion of students achieved grades equivalent to A*–B at A level.

In subsequent years, Strode continued to report strong performance across academic, technical and professional qualifications. The college's 2024–25 accountability statement reported a 97% A level pass rate across 28 subjects, with 55% of entries achieving A*–B grades, alongside a 96% pass rate across Level 3 BTEC provision.

== Campus and facilities ==
Strode College's campus has undergone significant redevelopment and investment since the opening of the current site in 1963. More than £20 million was invested in college facilities during the first decade of the 21st century, including improvements to teaching spaces and specialist facilities. The sports hall was extended in 2011 to create a dedicated dance and exercise studio.

The college campus includes a range of specialist facilities for academic, vocational and extracurricular activities. Strode Theatre, located on the college campus, provides performance, rehearsal and drama facilities for students and the wider community.

Further developments to the campus have included improvements to classrooms, science laboratories, vocational training spaces and student facilities, supporting the college's provision of sixth-form and further education programmes.

== Future development ==
Strode College has proposed a major redevelopment of its campus, including the replacement of the existing Block A building with a new teaching and student facilities block. The project is intended to modernise the campus and provide updated learning spaces for students and staff.

The proposed building would include classrooms, specialist learning spaces, a Learning Resource Centre, hospitality and catering facilities, and a central internal walkway referred to as a "student street". The plans also include social areas, dining facilities and improved links between the college campus and Strode Theatre.

The redevelopment plans include the introduction of a Costa Coffee outlet within the new facilities, alongside the existing refectory and catering provision. The outlet is expected to open in 2027 as part of the wider campus improvements.

The proposals form part of a wider investment programme to replace ageing buildings and improve the college estate, with the new Block A designed to incorporate energy efficiency measures and support the college's long-term educational provision.
