= Church of the Holy Trinity, Street =

Church in Somerset, England

Church of the Holy Trinity
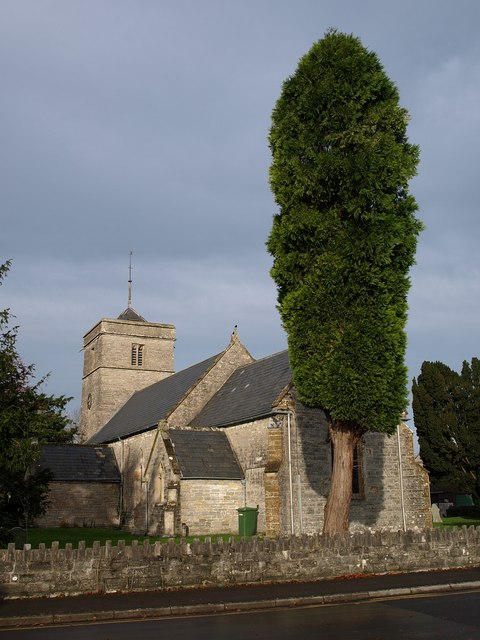

- Location within Somerset

General information
- Location: Street, Somerset, England
- Coordinates: 51.1315°N 2.7326°W
- Completed: 14th century

The Church of the Holy Trinity in Street, Somerset, England, dates from the 14th century but underwent extensive restoration in the 19th century. It has been designated as a Grade I listed building.

The church was originally dedicated to Gildas. The first recorded Rector was John de Hancle in 1304. The patronage of the church was held by Glastonbury Abbey until the dissolution of the monasteries when it passed to the Marquess of Bath.

The chancel pre dates the rest of the building, having been built about 1270. It still has the original window tracery. There is also a sculptured Sedilia. The nave and tower date from the 15th century. The tower contains eight bells, four of which date from 1777 In the early 19th century the north aisle was added, and the interior refurbished by Benjamin Ferrey in 1843, by which time an organ had been installed.

Between 2000 and 2004 the pews were removed and new lighting and under floor heating were installed.

The parish is part of the Street and Walton benefice within the Glastonbury deanery.

== See also ==
- Grade I listed buildings in Mendip
- List of Somerset towers
- List of ecclesiastical parishes in the Diocese of Bath and Wells
