= Compton Dundon =

Village and civil parish in Somerset, England

Coordinates: 51.0918°N 2.7323°W

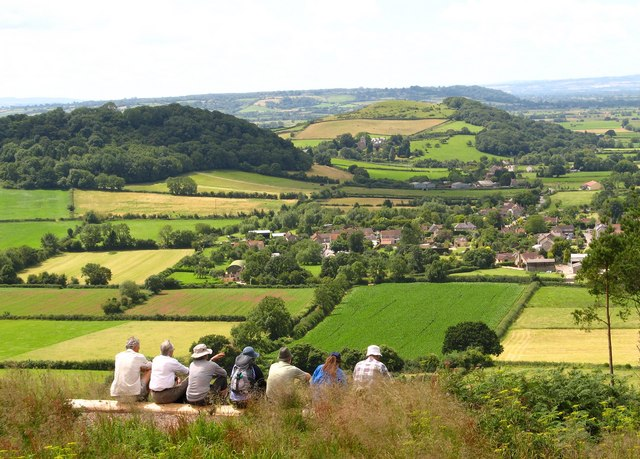
- View towards Compton Dundon

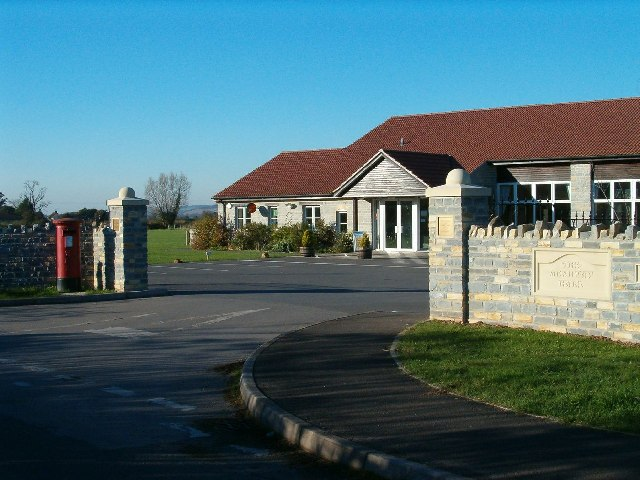
- Meadway Hall

- Location within Somerset
- Population: 705 (2011)
- OS grid reference: ST488327
- Unitary authority: Somerset Council
- Ceremonial county: Somerset
- Region: South West
- Country: England
- Sovereign state: United Kingdom
- Post town: Somerton
- Postcode district: TA11
- Dialling code: 01458
- Police: Avon and Somerset
- Fire: Devon and Somerset
- Ambulance: South Western
- UK Parliament: Glastonbury and Somerton

Compton Dundon is a village and civil parish in Somerset, England, lying beside King's Sedgemoor and the Polden Hills, 5 miles (8 km) south of Glastonbury and 4 miles (6 km) north of Somerton. The village has a population of 705. The parish includes the small village of Dundon and the hamlet of Littleton.

== History ==
Just outside the village is Dundon Hill (or Dundon Camp), an Iron Age hill fort, with 2 m (6.6 ft) ramparts. An excavation in 1916 found pottery and flints here, but the fort has been damaged by quarrying.

The manor was owned by Glastonbury Abbey at the time of the Domesday Book in 1086. The parish of Compton Dundon was part of the Whitley Hundred.

Paul Kemp-King writes in an unpublished manuscript that it is almost certain that there was once a bell foundry in the village, although its exact location is uncertain. Bells cast in Compton Dundon can be found in nearby villages: Somerton (a 1661 bell) and Aller (bells cast in 1638, 1640, and 1663 by Robert Austen), for example. Kemp-King writes that the difficulty of transporting the heavy bells by horse and cart made local casting by itinerant bell-founders desirable.

Within the parish is the Admiral Hood Monument celebrating Admiral Sir Samuel Hood. It has been designated by English Heritage as a Grade II* listed building.

== Governance ==
The parish council has responsibility for local issues, including setting an annual precept (local rate) to cover the council's operating costs and producing annual accounts for public scrutiny. The parish council evaluates local planning applications and works with the local police, district council officers, and neighbourhood watch groups on matters of crime, security, and traffic. The parish council's role also includes initiating projects for the maintenance and repair of parish facilities, as well as consulting with the district council on the maintenance, repair, and improvement of highways, drainage, footpaths, public transport, and street cleaning. Conservation matters (including trees and listed buildings) and environmental issues are also the responsibility of the council.

For local government purposes, since 1 April 2023, the parish comes under the unitary authority of Somerset Council. Prior to this, it was part of the non-metropolitan district of South Somerset (established under the Local Government Act 1972). It was part of Langport Rural District before 1974. Compton Dundon falls within the electoral ward of Wessex.

It is also part of the Glastonbury and Somerton county constituency represented in the House of Commons of the Parliament of the United Kingdom. It elects one Member of Parliament (MP) by the first past the post system of election.

== Geography ==
At the central crossroads is the remains of a 14th-century wayside cross.

Just south of the village is Great Breach and Copley Woods, a biological Site of Special Scientific Interest which is a Nature Conservation Review Woodland Site, owned and managed by the Somerset Wildlife Trust. The site consists of ancient and semi-natural broadleaved woodland. Two woodland types with a restricted distribution in Britain occur and the site supports a locally important invertebrate fauna.

== Religious sites ==
The parish Church of St Andrew, at Dundon, dates from the 14th century and has been designated by English Heritage as a Grade II* listed building. Its bells underwent a major renovation in 2025, having not been rung since 1935.

== Gallery ==
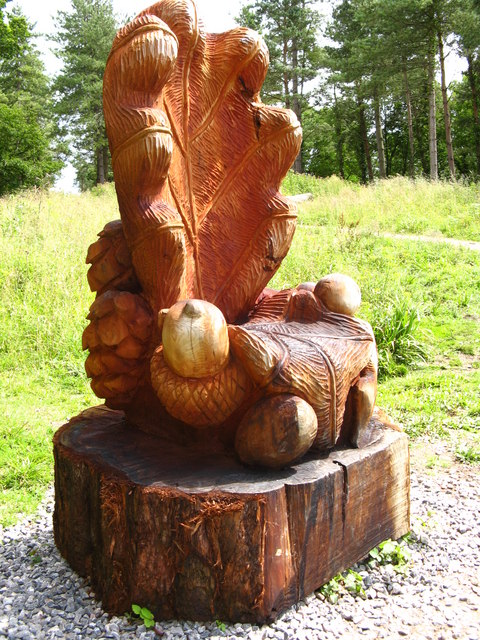
Carved seat above Compton Dundon

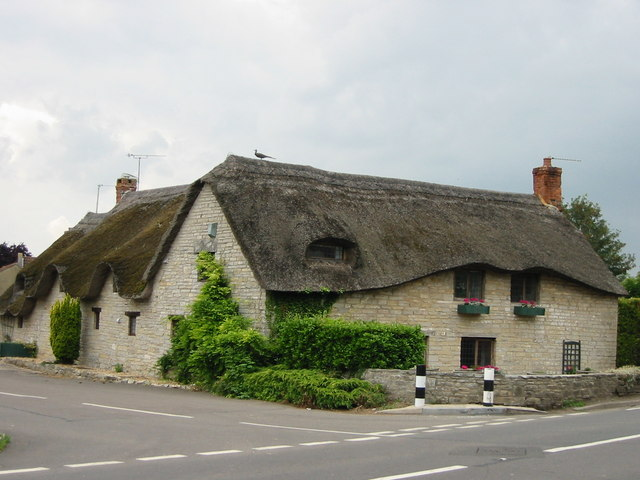
Thatched cottage in Compton Dundon
