= Clarks Village =

Coordinates: 51°07′42″N 2°44′24″W

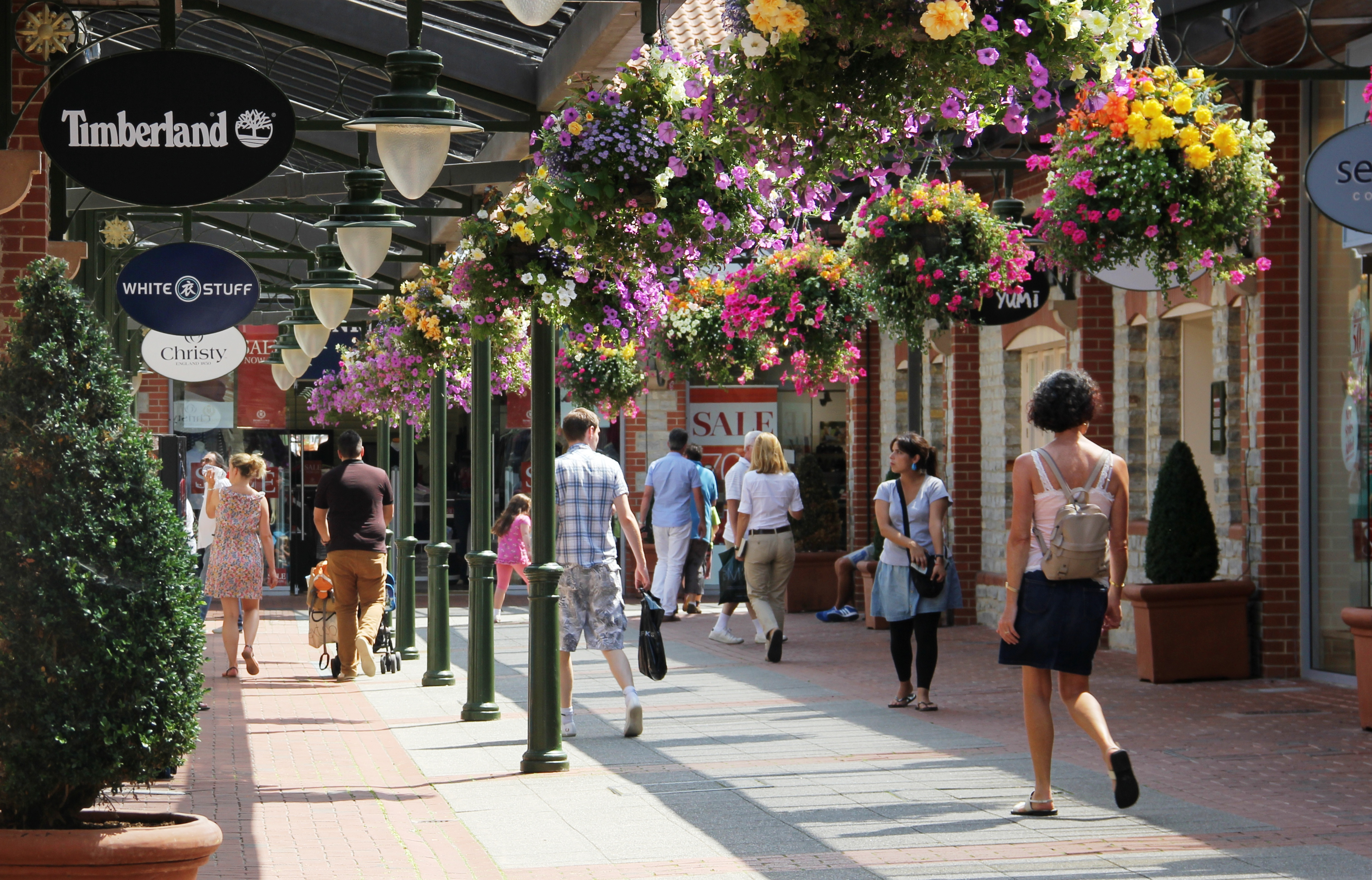
- The paved walkway and village setting with shops on either side
- Location: Street, Somerset, England
- Opened: 14 August 1993
- Owner: Landsec
- Num. of stores: 93
- Website: clarksvillage.co.uk

Clarks Village is an outlet shopping village in Street, Somerset, England. It was established in 1993 on the site of old C&J Clark factory buildings.

== History ==
In the 19th century Cyrus Clark started a business in sheepskin rugs, later joined by his brother James, who introduced the production of woollen slippers, and later, boots and shoes. However, shoes are no longer manufactured there.

Clarks Village opened on 14 August 1993 and gained over two million visitors in its first year. It grew to include over 90 high street and designer retailers, as well as a number of coffee shops, restaurants and fast food chains. The site is owned and managed by Land Securities Group Plc. Each year the range of shops and brands available changes. Many family events take place during the year with activities and school holiday activities. Clarks Village selects a charity of the year to support and Somerset Rural Youth Project was its chosen charity for 2016.

== Gallery ==
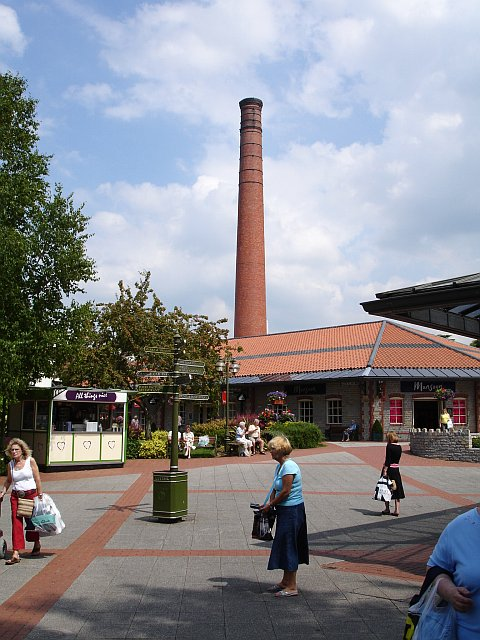
Clarks factory chimney

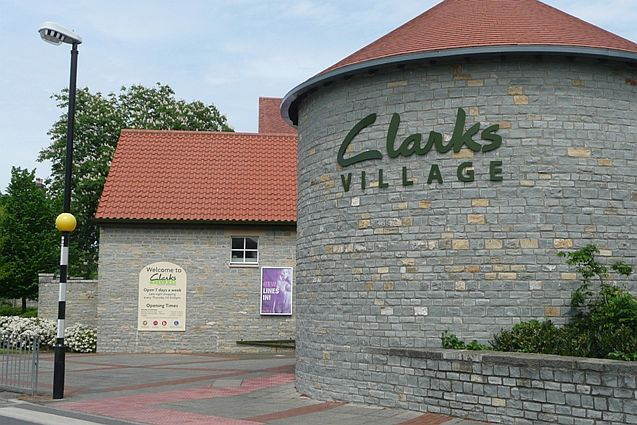
Northside car park entrance

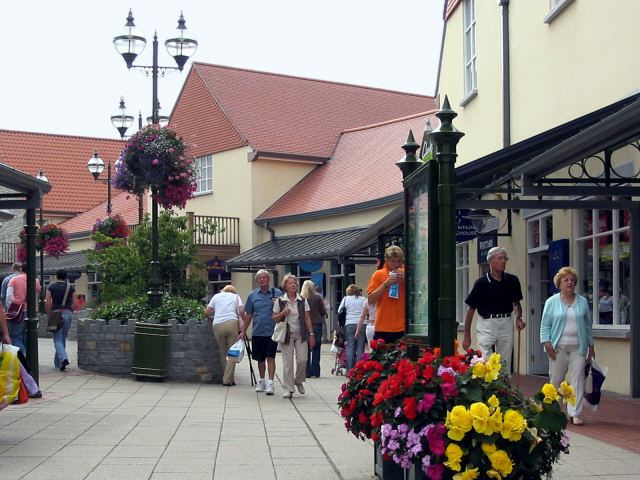
Shops in Clarks Village
