= East Polden Grasslands =

Protected area in Somerset, England

- Site of Special Scientific Interest
- Location within Somerset
- Location of East Polden Grasslands.
- Area of search: Somerset
- Grid reference: ST474325
- Coordinates: 51.08939°N 2.75242°W
- Interest: Biological
- Area: 124 hectares (1.24 km^{2}; 0.48 sq mi)
- Notification date: 1999

East Polden Grasslands (grid reference ST474325) is a 124 hectare biological Site of Special Scientific Interest on the Polden Hills in Somerset, notified in 1999.

This site has typical examples of species-rich, unimproved, calcareous grassland with scrub, and amongst the many plant species found in this habitat is the early gentian (Gentianella anglica), which is endemic to Britain. Its other main interest lies in its suitability as a habitat for the large blue butterfly (Phengaris arion), which has been successfully reintroduced onto the site. There are two nationally scarce grasshopper species present; rufous grasshopper (Gomphocerippus rufus) and woodland grasshopper (Omocestus rufipes). Several nationally scarce species of moth, beetle, bee and ant also occur.
