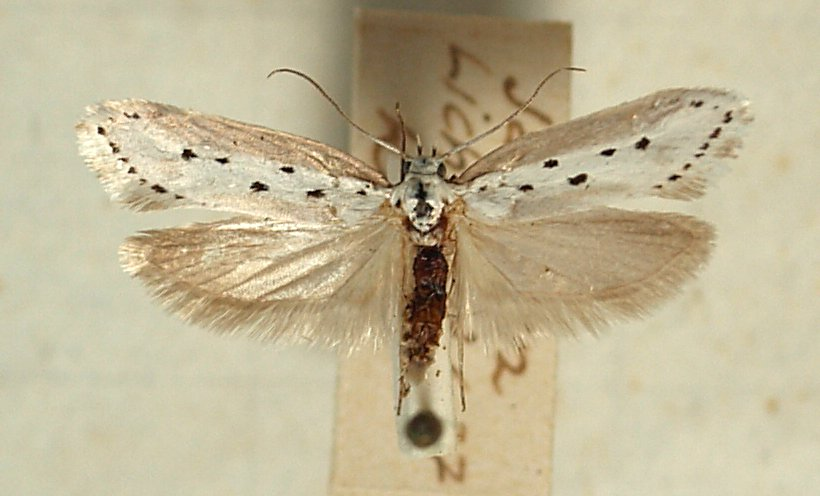

Scientific classification
- Kingdom: Animalia
- Phylum: Arthropoda
- Class: Insecta
- Order: Lepidoptera
- Family: Depressariidae
- Genus: Ethmia
- Species: E. terminella

Binomial name
- Ethmia terminella T.B. Fletcher, 1938

Synonyms
- Ethmia micropunctella Amsel, 1955; Tinea sexpunctella Hübner, [1810] (non Fabricius, 1794: preoccupied)

= Ethmia terminella =

Species of moth

Ethmia terminella is a moth of the family Depressariidae. It was described by Thomas Bainbrigge Fletcher in 1838 and is found in Europe.

The wingspan is 17–19 mm (0.67–0.75 in). The moth flies from May to July depending on the location.

The larvae feed on Echium vulgare.

Two subspecies have been described:

- Ethmia terminella terminella – most of range
- Ethmia terminella micropunctella Amsel, 1955 – Jordan
