= Street, Somerset =

Village in Somerset, England

Coordinates: 51.127°N 2.740°W

Street
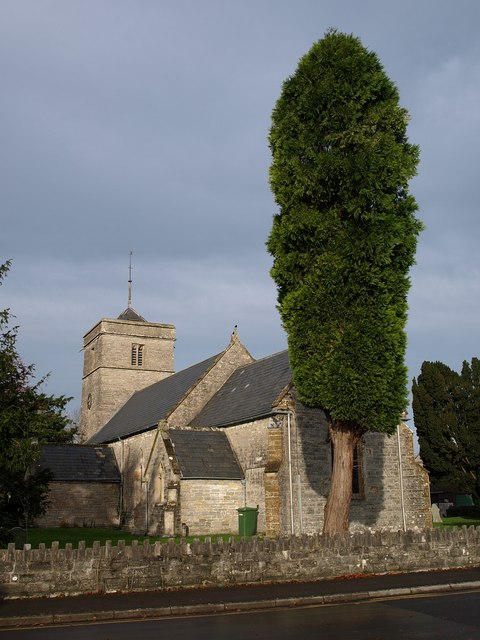
- Church of the Holy Trinity, Street

- Location within Somerset
- Population: 12,712 (Parish, 2021)
- OS grid reference: ST483366
- Unitary authority: Somerset
- Ceremonial county: Somerset
- Region: South West
- Country: England
- Sovereign state: United Kingdom
- Post town: STREET
- Postcode district: BA16
- Dialling code: 01458
- Police: Avon and Somerset
- Fire: Devon and Somerset
- Ambulance: South Western
- UK Parliament: Glastonbury and Somerton
- Website: Parish Council

Street is a large village and civil parish in Somerset, England. The village stands on a dry spot in the Somerset Levels at the end of the Polden Hills, and lies 2 miles (3 km) south-west of Glastonbury. At the 2021 census, the parish had a population of 12,712.

There is evidence of Roman occupation in the area. Much of the history of the village is influenced by the nearby Glastonbury Abbey. In the 12th-century, a causeway was built from Street to the Abbey to transport local Blue Lias stone to it. The Society of Friends was established in Street by the mid-17th century. One Quaker family, the Clarks, started a business in sheepskin rugs, woollen slippers and, later, boots and shoes. This became C&J Clark which still has its headquarters in Street. In 1993, redundant factory buildings were converted to form Clarks Village, the first purpose-built factory outlet in the United Kingdom. The Shoe Museum provides information about the history of Clarks and footwear manufacture in general.

The Clark family's former mansion and its estate at the edge of the village are now owned by Millfield School, an independent co-educational boarding school. Street is also home to Crispin School and Strode College.

To the north of Street is the River Brue, which marks the boundary with Glastonbury. South of Street are the Walton and Ivythorn Hills and East Polden Grasslands biological Sites of Special Scientific Interest. Strode Theatre provides a venue for films, exhibitions and live performances. The Anglican Parish Church of The Holy Trinity dates from the 14th century and has been designated by English Heritage as a Grade I listed building.

== History ==
The settlement's earliest known name is Lantokay, meaning the Llan (a sacred enclosure) of Kea, a Celtic saint. The place-name 'Street' is first attested in Anglo-Saxon charters from 725 and 971, where it appears as Stret. It appears as Strete juxta Glastone in a charter from 1330 formerly in the British Museum. The word is the Old English straet meaning 'Roman road'.

The centre of Street is where Lower Leigh hamlet was, and the road called Middle Leigh and the community called Overleigh are to the south of the village. In the 12th century, a causeway from Glastonbury was built to transport stone from what is now Street for rebuilding Glastonbury Abbey after a major fire in 1184. The causeway is about 100 yards (90 m) north of a Roman road running north from Ilchester. It will be seen that the name of the village predates the building of the causeway by more than four hundred years, and so the village is named after the Roman road and not the causeway.

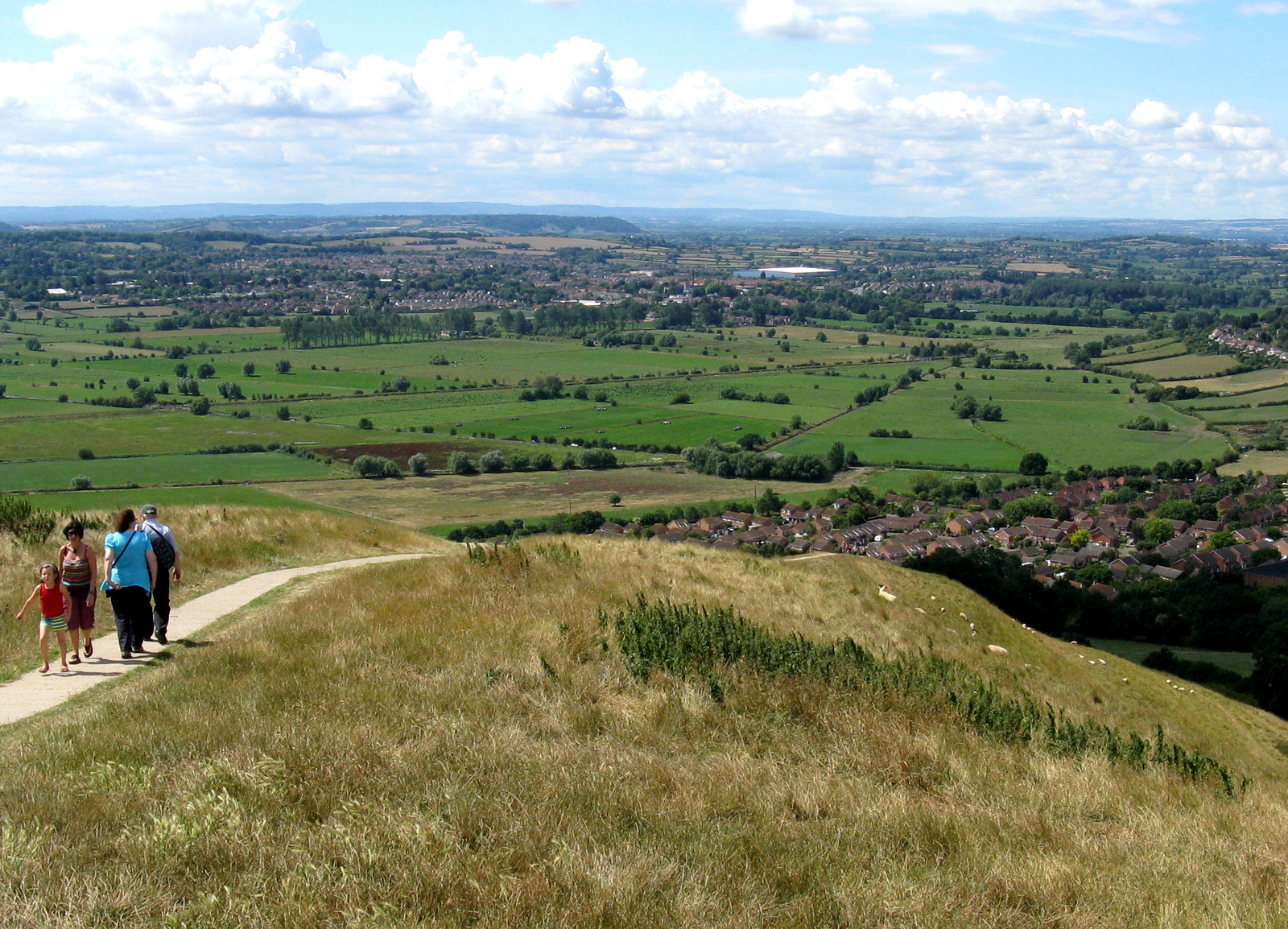
Street from Glastonbury Tor. The village is in the distance; the houses at lower right are in Glastonbury.

Quarries of the local blue lias stone were worked from as early as the 12th century to the end of the 19th century. It is a geological formation in southern England, part of the Lias Group. The Blue Lias consists of a sequence of limestone and shale layers, laid down in latest Triassic and early Jurassic times, between 195 and 200 million years ago. Its age corresponds to the Rhaetian to lower Sinemurian stages of the geologic timescale, thus fully including the Hettangian stage. It is the lowest of the three divisions of the Lower Jurassic period and, as such, is also given the name Lower Lias. It consists of thin blue argillaceous, or clay-like, limestone. The Blue Lias contains many fossils, especially ammonites. Fossils discovered in the lias include many ichthyosaurs, one of which has been adopted as the badge of Street. There is a display of Street fossils in the Natural History Museum in London.

The churchyard of the Parish Church has yielded one Iron Age coin, however the origin and significance is unclear, although the Dobunni were known to have produced coins in the area. A number of Roman pottery fragments, now in the Museum of Somerset. Remains of Roman villas exist on the south edge of Street near Marshalls Elm and Ivythorn. Buried remains of a Roman road were excavated in the early 20th century on the flood-plain of the river Brue between Glastonbury and Street. The parish churchyard is on the first flood-free ground near the river Brue and was probably the first land to be inhabited. The form of the large churchyard suggests a lan, a sacred area of a kind that was built in the first half of the 6th century. Llan or Lan is a common place name element in Brythonic languages such as Welsh, Cornish, Breton, Cumbric, and possibly Pictish. The original meaning of llan in Welsh is "an enclosed piece of land", but it later evolved to mean the parish surrounding a church.

One biography of St Gildas has the saint spending some time in Glastonbury Abbey, and moving to a site by the river, where he built a chapel to the Holy Trinity and there died. The Parish Church, now Holy Trinity, has at times been known as St Gildas' church. Glastonbury Abbey controlled Street until the Dissolution.

Sharpham Park is a 300-acre (120 ha) historic park, approximately two miles (three kilometres) west of Street, which dates back to the Bronze Age. The first known reference is a grant by King Edwy to the then Aethelwold in 957. In 1191 Sharpham Park was conferred by the soon-to-be King John to the Abbots of Glastonbury, who remained in possession of the park and house until the Dissolution of the Monasteries in 1539. From 1539 to 1707 the park was owned by the Duke of Somerset, Sir Edward Seymour, brother of Queen Jane; the Thynne family of Longleat, and the family of Sir Henry Gould. Sir Edward Dyer the Elizabethan poet and courtier (died 1607) was born here in 1543. The house is now a private residence and Grade II* listed building. Sharpham was also the birthplace of the novelist and dramatist Henry Fielding (1707–54), and the cleric William Gould.

Ivythorn Manor on Pages Hill was a medieval monastic house. It was rebuilt in 1488 for Abbot John Selwood of Glastonbury Abbey. After the Dissolution of the Monasteries it became a manor house owned by the Marshall and Sydenham families. Sir John Sydenham added a wing 1578 which was later demolished. By 1834 the house was largely ruined until its restoration around 1904, and a west wing was added in 1938. It is a Grade II* listed building.

== Governance ==
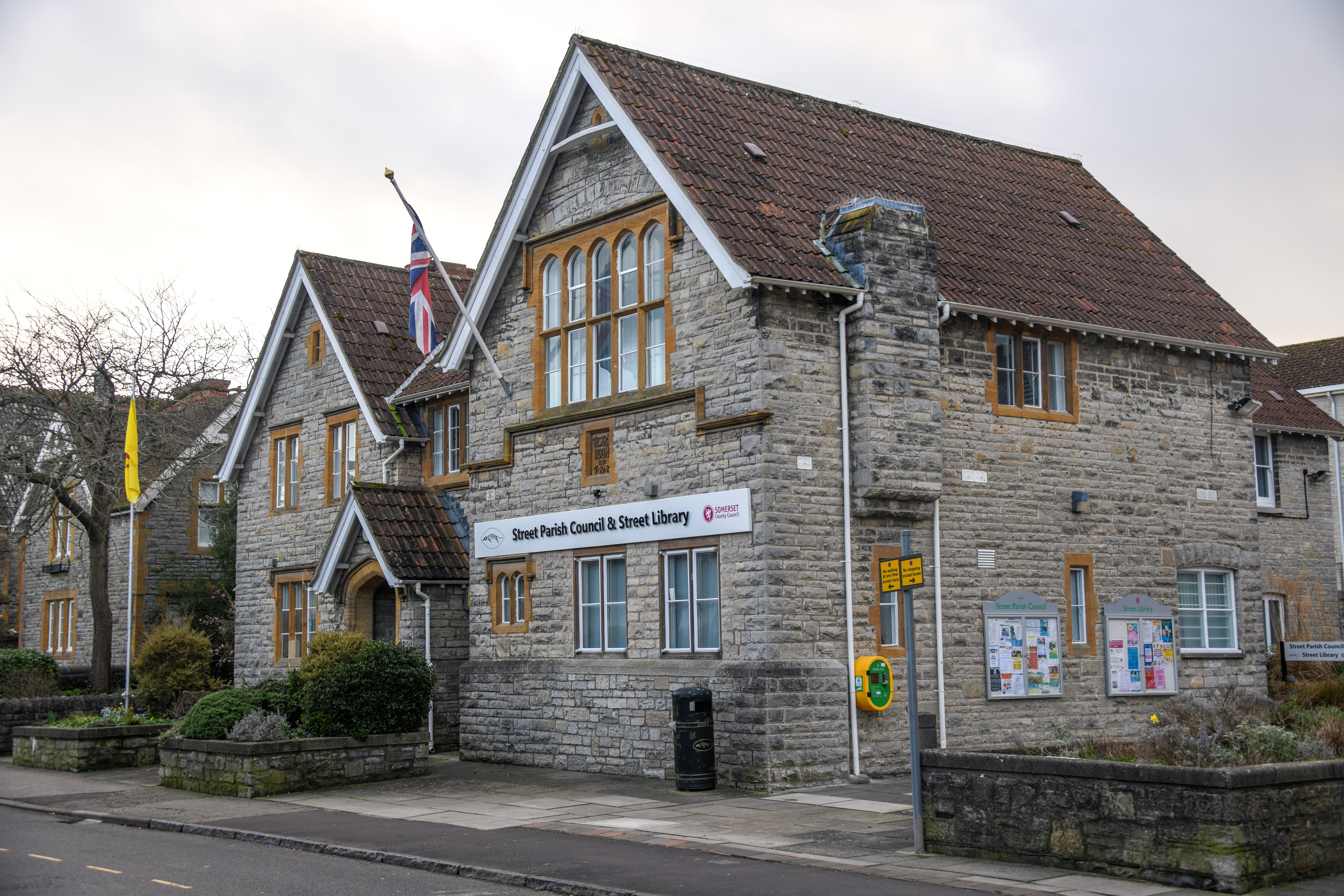
Parish Rooms and Library

There are two tiers of local government covering Street, at parish and unitary authority level: Street Parish Council and Somerset Council. The parish council is based at the Parish Rooms at 6 Leigh Road. The building also houses the village library.

For national elections, Street forms part of the Glastonbury and Somerton constituency.

=== Administrative history ===
Street was an ancient parish in the Whitley hundred of Somerset.

In 1853, the parish was made a local board district, with an elected board established to provide local government functions and oversee public health. Such districts were reconstituted as urban districts under the Local Government Act 1894.

Street Urban District was abolished in 1974 under the Local Government Act 1972. The area then became part of the new Mendip District. A successor parish called Street covering the former urban district was created as part of the 1974 reforms.

Mendip district was abolished in 2023. Somerset County Council then took over district-level functions across its area, making it a unitary authority, and was renamed Somerset Council.

=== Twinning ===
Street is twinned with Isny im Allgäu, a town in south-eastern Baden-Württemberg (Germany), and Notre Dame de Gravenchon in Normandy, France. Both twinnings are announced on the signs that welcome visitors to Street.

== Geography ==
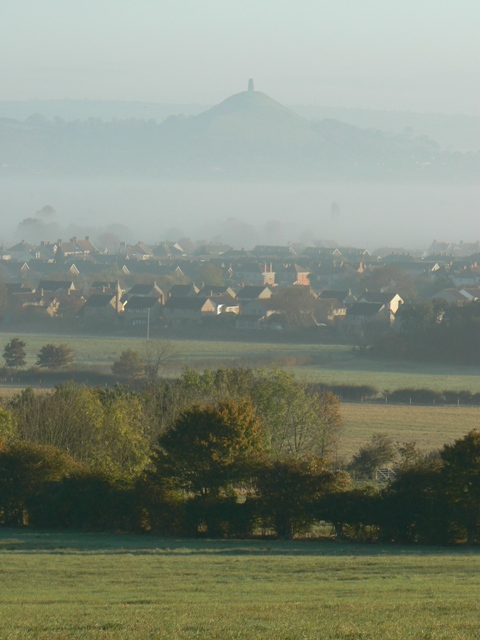
Street and Glastonbury Tor seen from Walton Hill

The River Brue marks the boundary with Glastonbury, to the north of Street. At the time of King Arthur, the Brue formed a lake just south of the hilly ground on which Glastonbury stands. This lake is one of the locations suggested by Arthurian legend as the home of the Lady of the Lake. Pomparles Bridge stood at the western end of this lake, guarding Glastonbury from the south, and it was here that Sir Bedivere is thought to have thrown the sword Excalibur into the waters after King Arthur fell at the Battle of Camlann. The old bridge was replaced by a reinforced concrete arch bridge in 1911.

Before the 13th century, the direct route to the sea at Highbridge was blocked by gravel banks and peat near Westhay. The course of the river partially encircled Glastonbury from the south, around the western side (through Beckery), and then north through the Panborough-Bleadney gap in the Wedmore-Wookey Hills, to join the River Axe just north of Bleadney. This route made it difficult for the officials of Glastonbury Abbey to transport produce from their outlying estates to the Abbey, and when the valley of the river Axe was in flood it backed up to flood Glastonbury itself. Sometime between 1230 and 1250, a new channel was constructed westwards into Meare Pool north of Meare, and further westwards to Mark Moor. The Brue Valley Living Landscape is a conservation project based on the Somerset Levels and Moors and managed by the Somerset Wildlife Trust.

The Walton and Ivythorn Hills biological Site of Special Scientific Interest south of the village lies at the end of the Polden Hills. This site is owned and managed by the National Trust. Walton and Ivythorn Hills support a complex mosaic of semi-natural habitats which includes unimproved calcareous grassland, dense and scattered scrub and broadleaved woodland. Structural diversity within the habitats, together with the extensive areas of sheltered wood-edge and scrub-edge margins provide ideal conditions for many species of invertebrate. Butterflies, leafhoppers, spiders and soldier flies are particularly well represented. The great green bush cricket (Tettigonia viridissima) is also of interest. It is adjacent to the East Polden Grasslands which has typical examples of species-rich, unimproved, calcareous grassland with scrub and amongst the many plant species found in this habitat is the early gentian (Gentianella anglica), which is endemic to Britain. Its other main interest lies in its suitability as a habitat for the large blue butterfly (Phengaris arion), which has been successfully reintroduced onto the site. There are two nationally scarce grasshopper species present; rufous grasshopper (Gomphocerippus rufus) and woodland grasshopper (Omocestus rufipes). Several nationally scarce species of moth, beetle, bee and ant also occur.

Street Heath is a nature reserve, managed by Somerset Wildlife Trust, and has outstanding examples of communities which were once common on the Somerset Levels. The vegetation consists of wet and dry heath, species-rich bog and carr woodland, with transitions between all these habitats. Rare ferns present include marsh fern (Thelypteris palustris) and royal fern (Osmunda regalis). Old peat workings and rhynes have a wetland community which includes bulrush (Typha latifolia), yellow flag iris (pseudacorus), cyperus-like sedge (Carex pseudocyperus) and lesser bur-reed (Sparganium natans). Insects recorded include 33 species of butterflies, 200 moths and 12 grasshoppers and crickets, with several notable rarities. Birds breeding in the carr woodland include the local willow tit

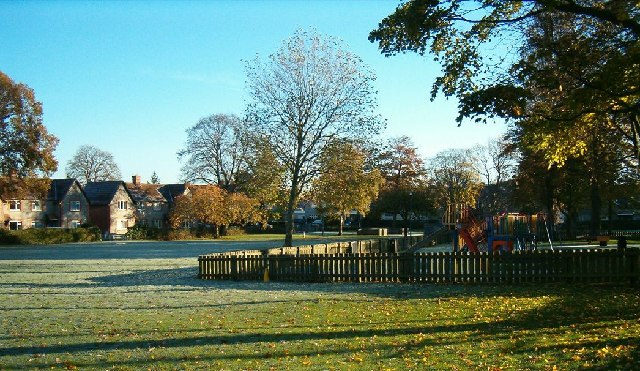
Merriman Park

Merriman Park is named after Nathaniel James Merriman (1809-1882). He was Curate then Vicar of Street, until he emigrated to South Africa. He rose to become Archdeacon of Grahamstown then Dean of Cape Town before being elevated the Episcopate.

=== Climate ===
Along with the rest of South West England, Street has a temperate climate which is generally wetter and milder than the rest of the country. The annual mean temperature is approximately 10 °C (50 °F). Seasonal temperature variation is less extreme than most of the United Kingdom because of the adjacent sea temperatures. The summer months of July and August are the warmest with mean daily maxima of approximately 21 °C (70 °F). In winter mean minimum temperatures of 1 °C (34 °F) or 2 °C (36 °F) are common. In the summer the Azores high pressure affects the south-west of England, however convective cloud sometimes forms inland, reducing the number of hours of sunshine. Annual sunshine rates are slightly less than the regional average of 1,600 hours. Most of the rainfall in the south-west is caused by Atlantic depressions or by convection. Most of the rainfall in autumn and winter is caused by the Atlantic depressions, which is when they are most active. In summer, a large proportion of the rainfall is caused by sun heating the ground leading to convection and to showers and thunderstorms. Average rainfall is around 700 mm (28 in). About 8–15 days of snowfall is typical. November to March have the highest mean wind speeds, and June to August have the lightest winds. The predominant wind direction is from the south-west.

== C. and J. Clark Ltd ==
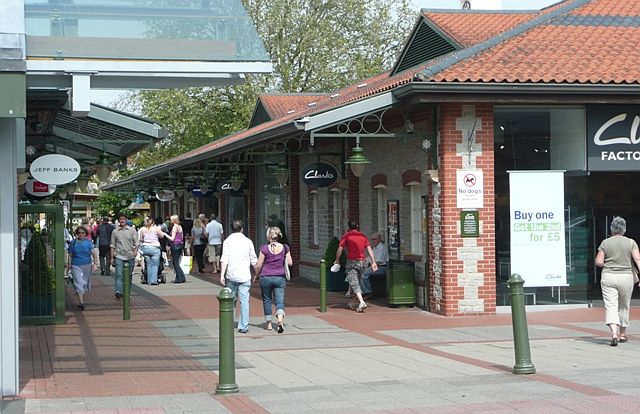
An entrance to Clarks Village

The Society of Friends established itself here in the mid-17th century, and among the close-knit group of Quaker families were the Clarks: Cyrus Clark started a business in sheepskin rugs, later joined by his brother James, who introduced the production of woollen slippers and then boots and shoes. Under James's son, William, the business flourished, and most of the profits were ploughed back into employee welfare, housing and education.

C&J Clark still has its headquarters in Street, behind a frontage that includes the clock tower and water tower, but shoes are no longer manufactured there. Instead, in 1993, redundant factory buildings were converted to form Clarks Village, the first purpose-built factory outlet in the United Kingdom. Despite strong concerns being voiced by local retailers at the time, the retail outlets have not led to a demise of the existing shops. The Shoe Museum provides information about the history of Clarks and footwear manufacture in general, and a selection of shop display showcards from the 1930s, the 1950s and the 1960s, and television advertisements.

The Clark family mansion and its estate at the edge of the village are now owned by Millfield School. The company, through the Society of Friends, also had its own small sanatorium and convalescent home on Ivythorn Hill overlooking the village. In 1931, the chalet-style building was leased to the Youth Hostel Association and became the first youth hostel in Somerset. It is still used for this purpose.

== Transport ==
In Roman times Street was close to the route of the Fosse Way and is now on the route of the modern A39 road which runs from Bath to Cornwall, and the A361.

Glastonbury and Street railway station was the biggest station on the original Somerset and Dorset Joint Railway main line from Highbridge to Evercreech Junction until closed in 1966 under the Beeching axe. Opened in 1854 as Glastonbury, and renamed in 1886, it had three platforms, two for Evercreech to Highbridge services and one for the branch service to Wells. The station had a large goods yard controlled from a signal box. The nearest stations are now around 9 miles away, at Castle Cary and Bridgwater. Replica level crossing gates have been placed at the old station entrance.

A number of bus services serve Street including route 376 to Bristol via Wells which is operated by First West of England and runs every hour. It is also served by Berrys Coaches daily 'Superfast' service to and from London.

== Education ==
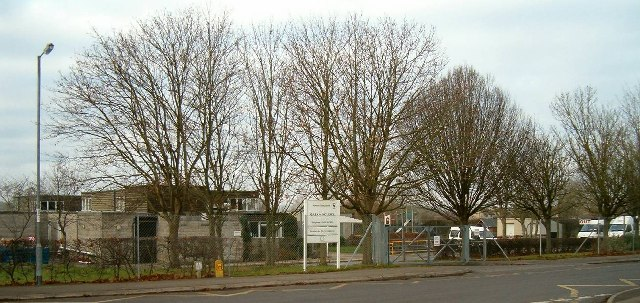
Avalon School

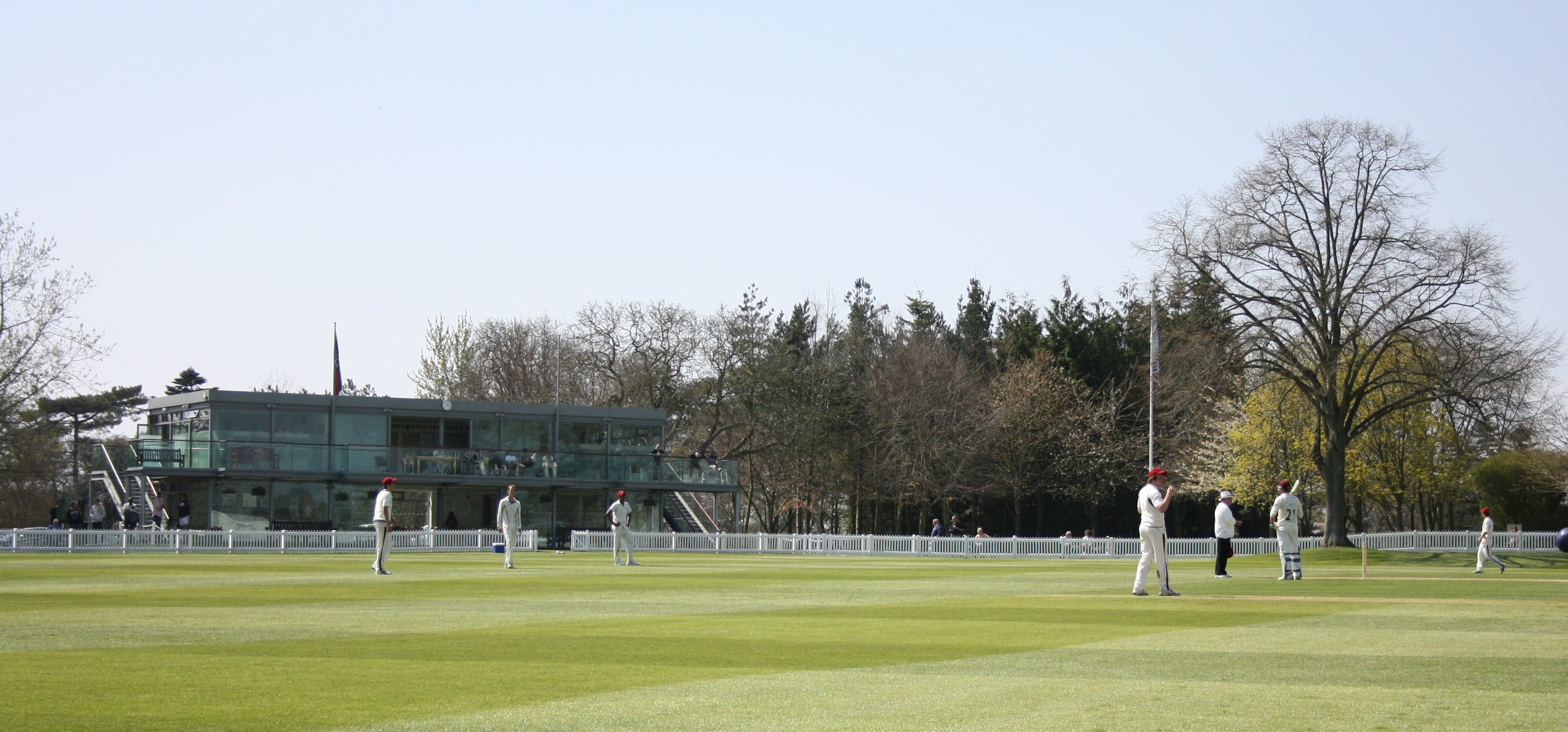
Millfield School cricket ground and pavilion

Primary infant/junior schools include Avalon, Brookside, Hindhayes, and Elmhurst.

Crispin School is a secondary school teaching 11- to 16-year-old students from Street and many local villages. It has 1084 students between the ages of 11 and 16 years enrolled. In 1997 it became the first Beacon School in Somerset. It is a Technology College and has a second specialism as a Language College. The school shares its campus with Strode College, a tertiary institution and further education college which provides education for 16+ students after they leave secondary school, these courses are usually A-levels or Business and Technology Education Councils (BTECs). The college also provides education for older/mature students, and provides some university level courses. The college is part of The University of Plymouth Colleges network.

At the edge of village is Millfield School, an independent co-educational boarding school which currently caters for 1,260 pupils, of which 910 are boarders. It was founded in 1935 by Boss Meyer, in the house and grounds originally owned by the Clark family, who owned and ran the major shoe manufacturer Clarks.

== Sport and leisure ==
Greenbank Pool, the outdoor public swimming pool

Street has a Non-League football club Street F.C. who play at The Tannery.

Street has two public swimming pools, one indoor and one outdoor. The indoor pool forms part of the Strode complex. The outdoor pool, Greenbank Pool, is open daily from early May until mid September each year. Greenbank Pool has an Art Deco design and is Grade II listed; it opened on 30 April 1937.

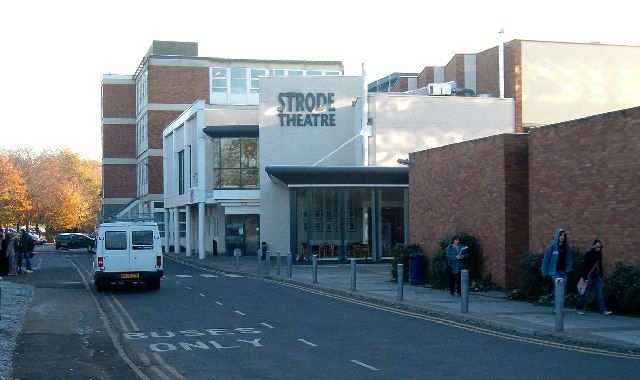
Strode Theatre

The only single use cinema in Street was closed down and converted into a nightclub in the 1990s. Strode Theatre, linked to the Crispin School and Strode College complex, is now the only place to see films, exhibitions and live performances. It opened on 5 October 1963 with a performance by the Bournemouth Symphony Orchestra. In 1999 the theatre was expanded with a new foyer, bar and box office along with improved rehearsal space and stage access, at a cost of £750,000 by the Steel, Coleman Davis partnership who received an award for the design. The expansion was funded by the Arts Council England.

The village is on the route of the Samaritans Way South West.

== Religious sites ==
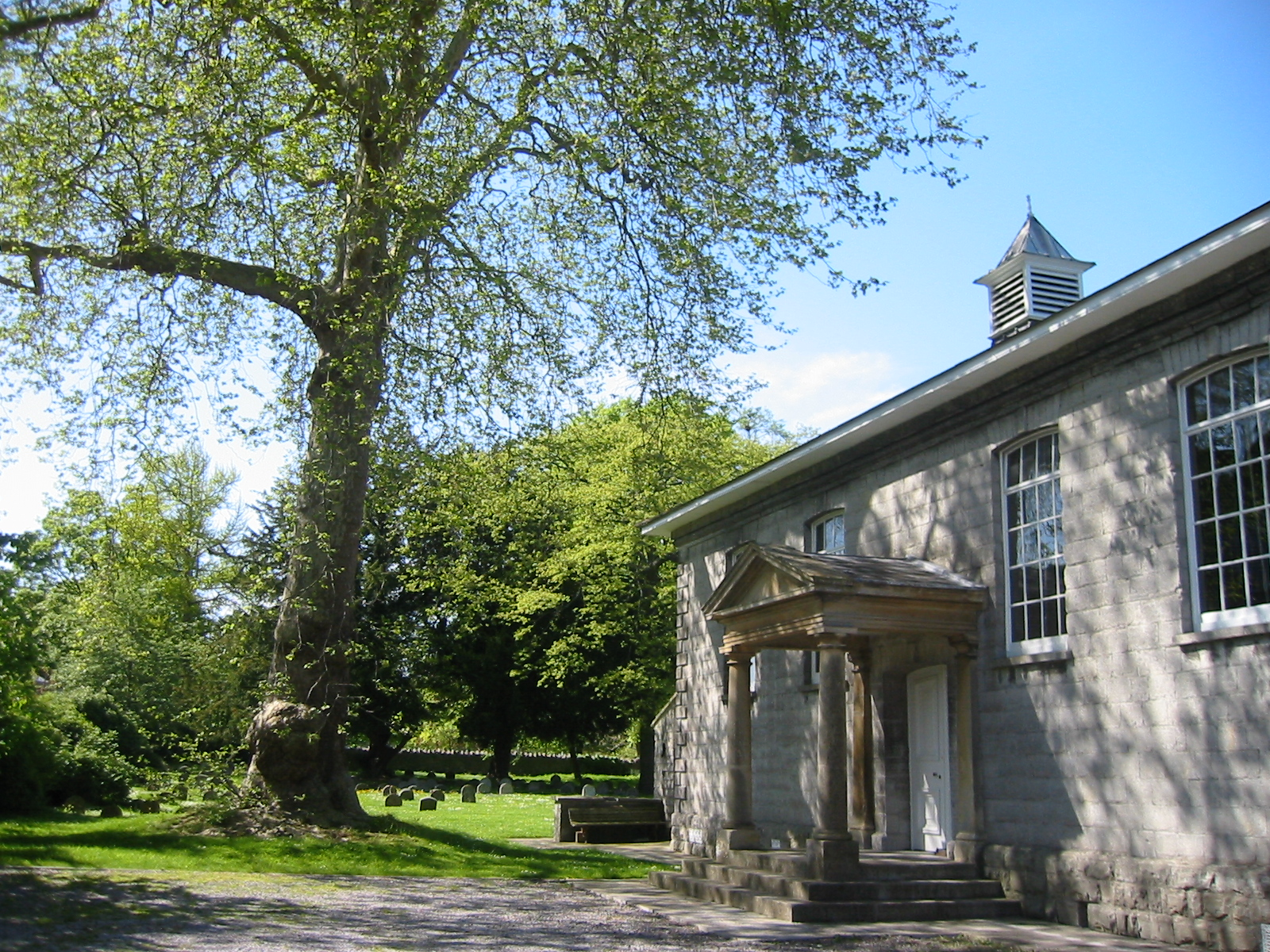
Street Friends meeting house, just north-east of the former Clark's factory

The Anglican Parish Church of The Holy Trinity dates from the 14th century but underwent extensive restoration in the 19th century. It has been designated by English Heritage as a Grade I listed building. The chancel pre dates the rest of the building, having been built about 1270. The first recorded Rector was John de Hancle in 1304. The parish is linked with Street Mission Church in Vestry Road and the church in Walton. There is also a Baptist church on Glaston Road. The Quaker Friends Meeting House was built in 1850, by J. Francis Cottrell of Bath. The United Reformed Church was built on High Street in 1854–55 and Street Methodist Church built on Leigh Road in 1893.

== Notable people ==
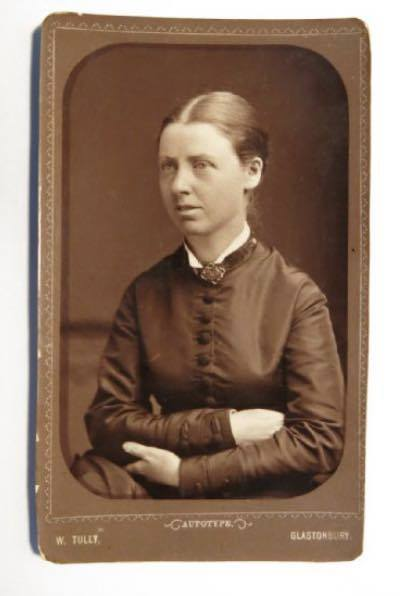
Catherine Impey, 1923

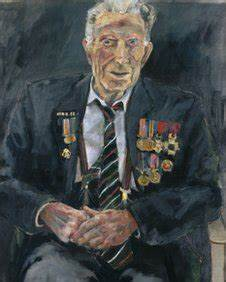
The Last Tommy – Harry Patch

- Edwin Edwards (1830–1907), organist, composer, Director of Music at Rugby School.
- John X. Merriman (1841–1926). His father was curate of the parish of Street and later third Bishop of Grahamstown. He emigrated to the Cape Colony with his parents in 1849, aged 8. He was the last prime minister of the Cape Colony before the formation of the Union of South Africa in 1910.
- Catherine Impey (1847–1923), the founder, editor, and publisher of an anti-race journal Anti-Caste (1888–1895). She rejected race, caste, and gender violence. She was friends with Frederick Douglass, Ida B. Wells and other African Americans with whom she continued a global movement against racism, casteism, and gender problems.
- Clemence Housman (1861–1955), an author, illustrator and suffragette, from 1924, lived with her brother Laurence in Street.
- Laurence Housman 1865–1959), playwright, writer and illustrator, lived in Street for 35 years; younger brother of the poet A.E. Housman.
- Alice Clark (1874–1934), historian and suffragist, author of Working Life of Women.
- Tosher Underwood (1878–1960), footballer who played 177 games for Brentford F.C..
- Hilda Clark (1881–1955), physician and humanitarian aid worker.
- V. S. Summerhayes (1897–1974), botanist, in charge of the orchid herbarium at Royal Botanic Gardens, Kew for 39 years.
- Harry Patch (1898–2009), the last surviving 'Tommy' from WWI, moved to Street in the early 1940s, where he ran a plumbing company until retirement at age 65.
- John Hinde (1916–1997), photographer whose idealistic and nostalgic style influenced the art of postcard photography and was known for his meticulously planned shoots.
- Helen Chamberlain (born 1967), TV presenter.
- Jaye Jacobs (born 1982), actress, grew up locally.

== Freedom of the Parish ==
The following people and military units have received the Freedom of the Parish of Street.

- WO 1 Matthew Tomlinson: 16 October 2010.
