= Strode Theatre =

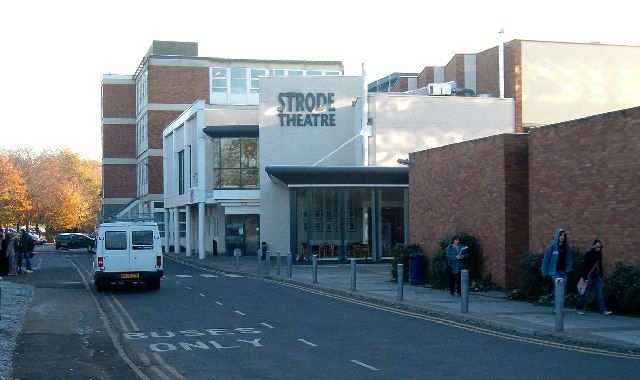

- Location within Somerset
- Address: Strode College, Church Road; Street; England
- Coordinates: 51.1298°N 2.7334°W
- Capacity: 343 seats
- Type: Provincial

Construction
- Opened: 1963

Website
- www.strodetheatre.co.uk/index.php

Strode Theatre is a mixed arts venue in Street, Somerset, England. It has a 1960s two-tiered 343 seat purpose-built main theatre and a versatile modern Studio space, with retractable seating for 64. It hosts a programme of live professional and amateur theatre productions, live folk, classical and rock/pop music; popular, European and art-house film; live broadcasts from major international venues, such as London's National Theatre and New York's Metropolitan Opera; and visual arts exhibitions.

Strode Theatre is part of Strode College, but operates independently and is largely self-financing, while providing a rehearsal and performance arts facility, and a programme of events for students from the college.

== Building ==
The building's structure is conventional, with a proscenium arch stage. The two tiers of seats are set at a steep gradient, with the option to just use the stalls for smaller performances. The orchestra pit is convertible to allow for different types of performances.

== Finance ==
Strode Theatre received financial support from Somerset County Council, Mendip District Council until funding to the arts ceased in 2011. it continues to receive a small grant Street Parish Council, and a contribution from Strode College. The theatre is otherwise an entirely self-financing entity; mainly from Box office revenue and other subsidiary revenue, such as the Café-Bar, art exhibition sales and advertising.

The Friends of Strode Theatre are a separate charity, who raise funds through membership and fundraising events to support the theatre with grants for capital spending projects, such as technical developments and refurbishments.

== History ==
Strode Theatre opened as a community theatre on 5 October 1963 with a performance by the Bournemouth Symphony Orchestra. It was funded by the Clark Foundation, set up by the Clarks brothers, in response to plans to build a college nearby. It is named after the 17th-century politician and philanthropist, William Strode.

In 1994, the theatre was redecorated during works which included new carpets and heating system, costing £115,000 (equivalent to £242,648 in 2025). In 1999 the theatre was expanded with a new foyer, bar and box office along with rehearsal space, meeting room and stage access, at a cost of £750,000 by the Steel, Coleman Davis partnership who received an award for the design. The expansion was funded by the Arts Council England, and it was at this point that it became part of Strode College, and began use as a cinema as well as associating with organisations such as Strode Opera.

In 2016, the rehearsal space was converted into a multi-purpose studio space, with retractable seating for 64 people.

By 1984, the theatre was receiving 30,000 visitors each year. Today it receives 60,000 visitors per year, and is an increasingly busy venue, serving communities throughout mid-Somerset, but also drawing audiences for some events from Bristol, Devon, Dorset, South Wales and Gloucestershire.
