= Walton, Somerset =

Village and civil parish in Somerset, England

Coordinates: 51.124°N 2.772°W

Walton
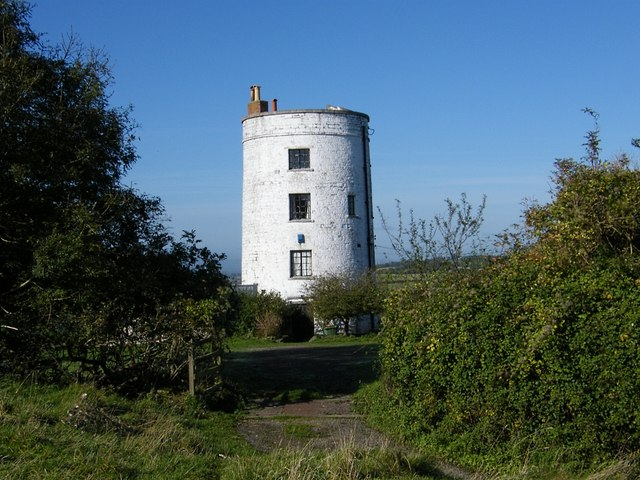
- Walton windmill

- Location within Somerset
- Population: 1,106 (2011 Census)
- OS grid reference: ST465365
- Civil parish: Walton
- Unitary authority: Somerset Council
- Ceremonial county: Somerset
- Region: South West
- Country: England
- Sovereign state: United Kingdom
- Post town: STREET
- Postcode district: BA16
- Dialling code: 01458
- Police: Avon and Somerset
- Fire: Devon and Somerset
- Ambulance: South Western
- UK Parliament: Wells and Mendip Hills
- Website: Walton Parish Council

Walton is a village and civil parish on the Polden Hills in Somerset, England, 1.5 miles (2.4 km) west of Street. The parish includes the hamlet of Asney.

== History ==
Saxon pressure seems to have driven the Britons from the immediate area around 650 A.D. About 700 A.D. the former Celtic monastery at Glastonbury was revived under royal Saxon patronage. By about 740 A.D. the general lines of parish boundaries in this area seem to have been fixed. This early development may well have been due to the organising urges of the monastic authorities. The parish of Walton was part of the Whitley Hundred, which took its name from Whitley Wood in the parish.

The name Walton comes from settlement/farmstead of Wealas — native Celts which is what the new Anglo-Saxon speaking peoples called the native inhabitants of England. There is strong evidence that in many areas of England taken over by Germanic speaking settlers, the native British (Wealas) remained undisturbed, farming the same land they did when the Romans left. Over time they just adopted or forgot their Celtic tongue (similar to Old Welsh/Cornish) for the language and culture of the newcomers in order to climb the social ladder or were coerced to do so. It was in the Anglo-Saxon interest that the native British carry on as usual to ensure the economy produced food and goods for the new landowners.

Walton was a manor of Glastonbury Abbey at the time of the Domesday Book, which talks about 30 hides. A hide for tax purposes (Danegeld) was counted as about 150 acres (0.61 km^{2}) worked under the 3 field system. Thus Walton could have been some 4,500 acres (18 km^{2}), all owned and directly managed by the Abbey. With the Dissolution of the monasteries and the scramble for monastic assets, Sir John Thynne of Longleat acquired Walton; lock, stock and barrel. The entire village was owned by the Bath estate until sold by auction in 1939.

The population rose slowly from the 150 or so in 1087 to nearly 400 in 1801, and nearly 800 by 1845. Emigration, enclosures and agricultural depression severely drove down the numbers as the 19th century rolled on.

With the rise in importance of Street and the growth of a more varied, mobile society, the population started to rise again.

== Governance ==
The parish council has responsibility for local issues, including setting an annual precept (local rate) to cover the council’s operating costs and producing annual accounts for public scrutiny. The parish council evaluates local planning applications and works with the local police, district council officers, and neighbourhood watch groups on matters of crime, security, and traffic. The parish council's role also includes initiating projects for the maintenance and repair of parish facilities, as well as consulting with the district council on the maintenance, repair, and improvement of highways, drainage, footpaths, public transport, and street cleaning. Conservation matters (including trees and listed buildings) and environmental issues are also the responsibility of the council.

For local government purposes, the village falls within the Somerset Council unitary authority area, which was created on 1 April 2023. From 1894 to 31 March 1974, the village was part of Wells Rural District, and from 1 April 1974 to 31 March 2023, it fell within of the non-metropolitan district of Mendip.

Walton is part of the electoral ward of Moor, which also includes Meare to the north. At the 2011 Census, the population of the ward was 2,540. The ward itself falls within the constituency of Wells and Mendip Hills.

== Landmarks ==
Walton windmill was described as "new-erected" in 1741. It was worked until 1906. It is now a private residence.

Walton Hill, part of the Polden Hills, on which there are remains of ancient earthworks, rises south of the village. The hill is part of a Site of Special Scientific Interest.

== Religious sites ==
A Norman church was erected at about 1150 and rebuilt about 1350, when Street church was going up. Street was one of the 'seven churches' claimed by the Abbey under the Ina charter. Walton was in effect a chapelry of Street but the rectors of Street — when resident — lived at Walton in some style. The Old Parsonage is believed to be what remains of the monastic manor courthouse with an attached house.

The Church of The Holy Trinity was rebuilt in 1866 by John Norton with carved work by Seymour of Taunton. It is a Grade II listed building.

== Notable residents ==
There is no evidence in the parish registers or other documents pertaining to Walton to support the popular notion the family of William Henry Smith the founder of W H Smith came from Walton. This idea seems to have taken root from William Henry SMITH's father having Walton as a middle name and is more likely to have been either the surname of a relative, friend or business associate. It could also be a mis-transcription of Walter.
