= Polden Hills =

Small hill range in Somerset, England

Coordinates: 51°08′15″N 2°53′02″W

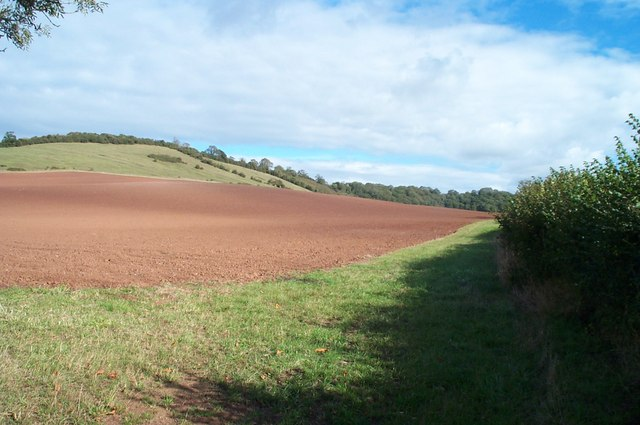
The Polden Hills

The Polden Hills in Somerset, England, are a long, low ridge, extending for 10 miles (16 km), and separated from the Mendip Hills, to which they are nearly parallel, by a marshy tract known as the Somerset Levels. They are now bisected at their western end by the M5 motorway and a railway, the Bristol and Exeter Railway, part of the Great Western Main Line.

== Location and history ==
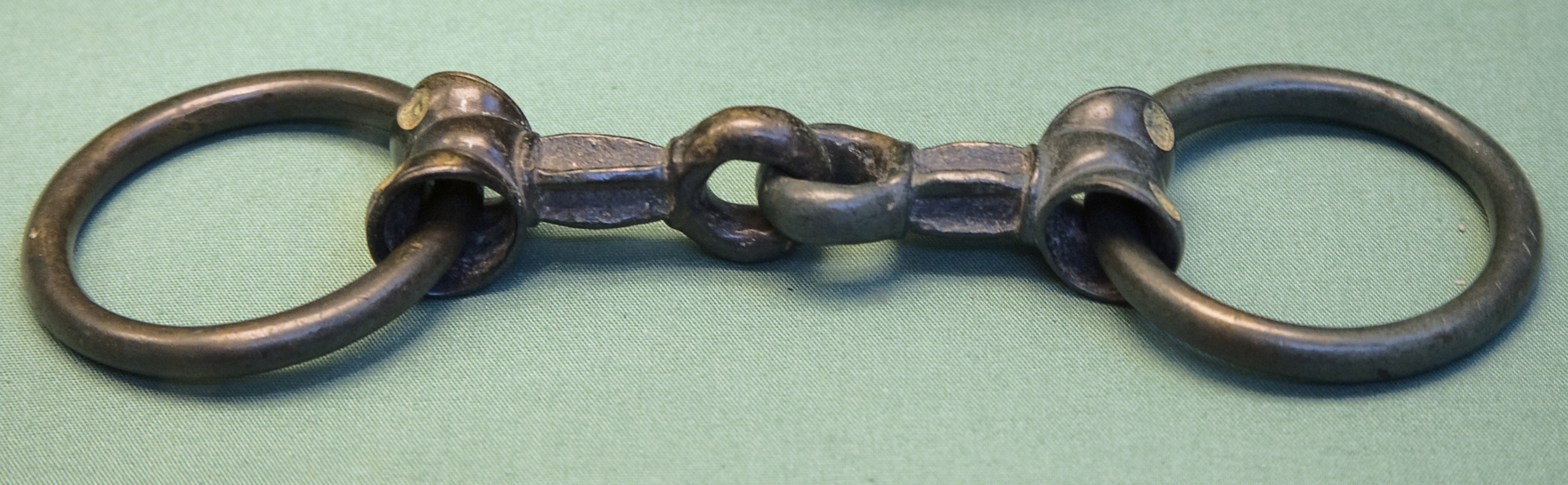
Horse-fitting from the Polden Hills Hoard in the British Museum

The hills stretch from Puriton, near Bridgwater, in the west, to Street, in the east. The ridge of the hill once accommodated a Roman road, from Ilchester to the port of Combwich. Roman and Iron Age objects from the "Polden Hill Hoard" are now in the British Museum. This road crossed the River Parrett by means of a ford, at the White House (White House Rhyne), on the Pawlett Hams. This western extension forms part of a Saxon route. The river crossing could only be used a few hours per day at low tide and was used by Samuel Taylor Coleridge in the 1790s when he stayed at Nether Stowey, to travel to and from Bristol. It went out of use as other roads were improved and the White House, a former public house, is now just a ruin. The modern road, now the A39, is carried on a causeway from the King's Sedgemoor Drain, at Bawdrip, to Bridgwater.

== Geology ==
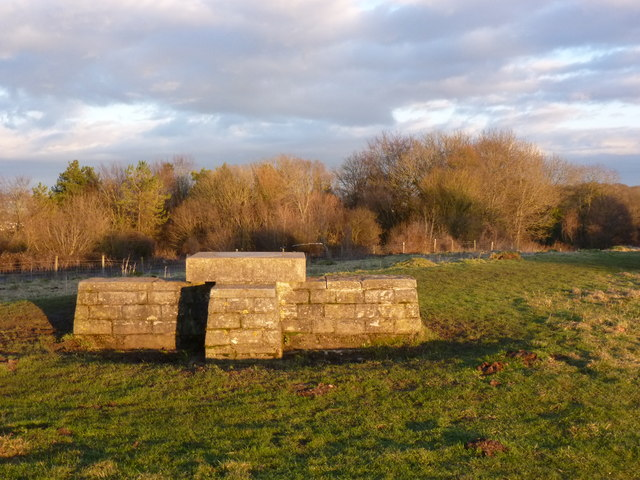
Walton Hill, Polden Hills

The Poldens are a low narrow ridge of late Triassic/early Jurassic mudstones (often referred to as clay) alternating with limestones. The south-southwest facing scarp is formed by a succession of rocks, lowermost of which are the mudstones of the Mercia Mudstone Group (formerly known as the Keuper Marl), overlain in the west by more mudstones of the late Triassic age Blue Anchor Formation (formerly 'Tea Green Marls'), a thin unit recorded from Puriton Hill east to the vicinity of Stawell. Elsewhere the overlying layer is that of the late Triassic (Rhaetian) age Westbury Formation (formerly known as the Rhaetic clays or Westbury Beds) consisting of mudstones and limestones. Stratigraphically above these are the mudstones and limestones of the Blue Lias, forming the north-northeasterly directed dip-slope of these hills. Blue Lias is believed to have been quarried on the Polden Hills in the 15th century; and was quarried in Puriton from the early 19th century until the 1973, when the local cement works closed. The outcrop is intersected by two sets of normal faults aligned roughly WSW–ENE and WNW–ESE. At the east end of the range, Dundon Hill forms an outlier of the higher formations. The low ground to both north and south is covered by thick alluvial deposits and peat.

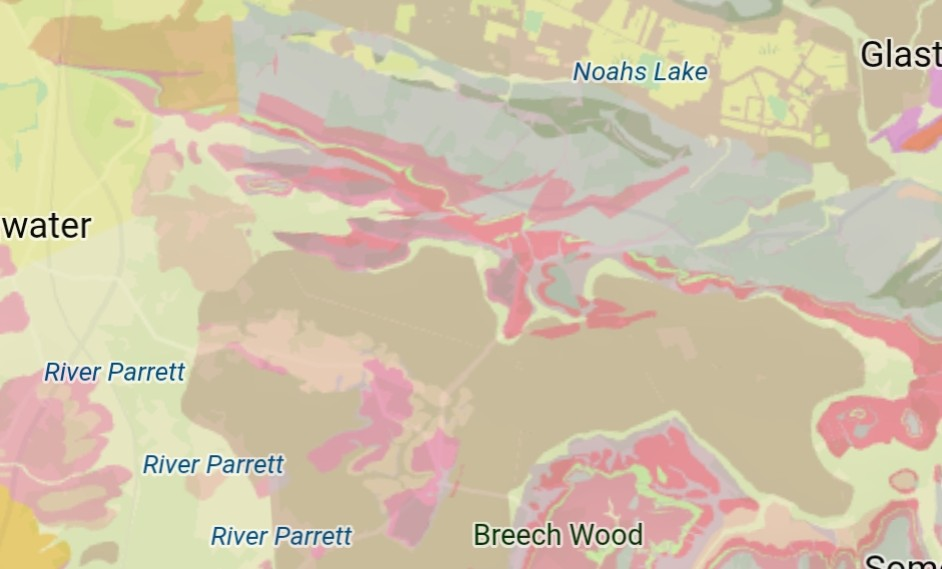
Geological map of the Polden Hills, Somerset

== Ecology ==
Great Breach and Copley Woods near Compton Dundon is a Nature Conservation Review Woodland Site, owned and managed by the Somerset Wildlife Trust. It has been designated as a biological Site of Special Scientific Interest because of the invertebrate population.

In April 2017 the National Lottery awarded a grant to Butterfly Conservation, to help expand the populations of brown hairstreak (Thecla betulae) and the large blue (Phengaris arion) butterflies across a network of sixteen sites. The brown hairstreak is associated with hedges, scrub and woodland edges with plenty of blackthorn (Prunus spinosa). The easiest way to find the butterfly is to look for the white eggs on the black twigs of blackthorn in winter; the annual cutting of hedges is considered one of the reasons for butterfly's decline. Change of hedgerow management from flailing and annual cutting to more a traditional laying has led to an increase in eggs at six sites, and over three winters, found the brown hairstreak to be stable there. Eggs have increased in three other sites and have returned to two other sites. The change in hedgerow management has increased the amount of suitable, young-growth blackthorn, for egg-laying females. The large blue butterfly has a complex life-cycle with the larva feeding on thyme (Thymus vulgaris) and marjoram (Origanum majorana), and later tricking red ants (Myrmica sabuleti) into thinking it is an escaped ant grub. Overwintering in an ants' nest, the larva feeds on the grubs, with pupation taking place in early June. Habitat improvement for the large blue occurred at thirteen locations with contractors and volunteers restoring 8 hectares of limestone grassland, by scrub cutting. The butterfly has since bred on much of this area. To increase the available foodplants, 2,500 plug plants of thyme were grown by Bridgwater College and Groves Nursery, and planted on five of the sites. Marjoram seed was also collected and sown on the scrub-cleared sites. In 2019 the large blue was found at ten of the sites, an increase of four since 2017.

== Centres of population ==
The former medieval planned town of Caput Montis was located at the western end of the Polden Hills. Caput Montis failed as a planned town and now exists as the earthworks of a motte and bailey in the hamlet of Downend, now a detached part of the village of Puriton.

There was also at Dunball a railway halt, a hotel, a post office and a wharf – part of the port of Bridgwater.

There are a number of small villages situated on both slopes of the ridge, many of which are named in Domesday. Most of the eastern villages, from Street to Cossington, and possibly Woolavington, (which are also parishes) are located in medieval planned parishes. They once formed parts of the estates of Glastonbury Abbey.

=== Villages of the Polden Hills (west to east) ===
Puriton – Bawdrip – Woolavington – Cossington – Stawell – Chilton Polden – Edington – Catcott – Shapwick – Ashcott – Walton – Street

== See also ==
- Geology of Somerset
- Somerset Levels – Coastal plain and wetland area of Somerset, England
