= Priestman =

Priestman is a surname. Notable people with the surname include:

- Anna Maria Priestman (1828–1914), British social reformer and women's rights activist
- Bev Priestman (born 1986), English football manager and head coach
- Brian Priestman (1927–2014), British conductor and academic
- Henry Priestman (born 1955), English rock singer, keyboardist, record producer and songwriter
- Henry Priestman (Royal Navy officer) (c. 1647–1712), English Member of Parliament and Royal Navy captain
- Howard Priestman (1865–1931), British mountaineer, photographer and cartographer
- Jane Priestman (1930–2021), British designer
- John Priestman (1855–1941), British shipbuilder
- John Priestman (British Army officer) (1885–1964), British Army major-general
- Jonathan Priestman (1786–1863), English Quaker businessman and minister
- Margaret Tanner (1817–1905), née Priestman, English suffragist
- Oscar Priestman (born 2003), Australian soccer player
- Richard Priestman (born 1955), British Olympic archer and coach
- William Dent Priestman (1847–1936), Quaker and combustion engine pioneer, inventor of the first British internal combustion engine to burn a fuel heavier than petrol
