= Anna Maria Priestman =

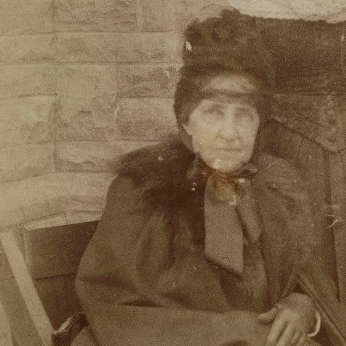
- in 1891
- Born: Anna Maria Priestman; 23 March 1828; Newcastle-upon-Tyne, England
- Died: 9 October 1914 (aged 86); Bristol, England

Anna Maria Priestman (23 March 1828 – 9 October 1914), was a British social reformer and women's rights activist.

== Early life ==
Anna Maria Priestman was born on 23 March 1828, the seventh of nine children of Jonathan Priestman (d. 1863), a wealthy Quaker tanner from Newcastle-upon-Tyne, and Rachel Bragg (1791–1854), a minister in the Society of Friends, and the daughter of Margaret Wilson, also a Quaker minister. They lived in the Summerhill district of Newcastle.

== Career ==
Priestman, along with members of hers and the Bright family, were important in the creation of some of the first women's suffrage societies, founded in London, Bristol, and Bath.

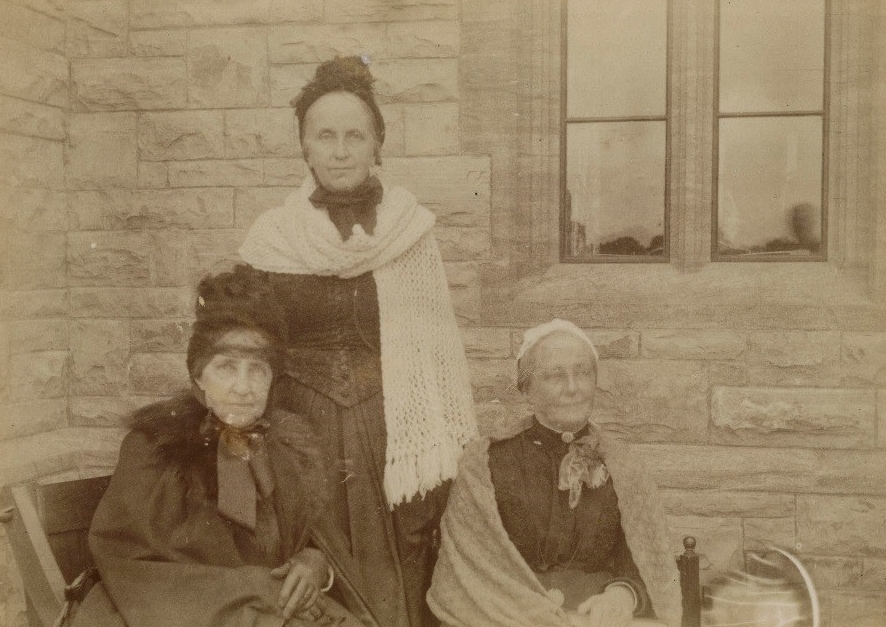
Anna Maria, Margaret (Tanner) and Mary Priestman in 1891

She was also a supporter of the Ladies National Association for the Repeal of the Contagious Diseases Acts, which was formed in 1870 by Josephine Butler to protest against legislation which undermined the civil rights of those who had been designated prostitutes by the authorities in specified naval and military towns. Her sister Mary Priestman was the secretary of this organization and her sister Margaret Tanner was its treasurer. All three sisters supported international campaigns against the government regulation of prostitution, and continued their family's close association with the temperance movement.

== Legacy ==
Priestman's photographs, papers related to her speeches, diaries, and her correspondence including letters to Margaret Clark Gillett, Alice Clark, Helen Priestman Bright, Priscilla Bright McLaren and Margaret Tanner, covering the period from 1837 to 1913 are held by the National Archives.

== Personal life ==
Priestman chose to remain single, and discussed her views on marriage in correspondence with her cousin and lifelong friend Jane Pease, who also never married.

== Later life ==
Priestman died at their Bristol home, 37 Durdham Park, which she shared with her sister Mary Priestman, on 9 October 1914, five days after her sister died. "The outbreak of the First World War was said to have been too much for either herself or Mary Priestman to bear."
