= Elizabeth Spence Watson =

English social reformer

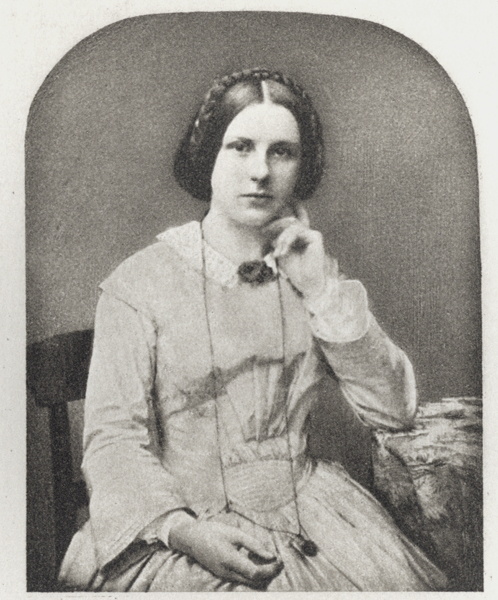
Elizabeth Richardson, 1855 photograph

Elizabeth Spence Watson (née Richardson; 1838–1919) was an English social reformer. Married to Robert Spence Watson, she campaigned as a suffragist, pacifist and temperance activist. She was known as Mrs Spence Watson; the surname was double-barrelled, but not hyphenated.

== Background and early life ==
She was born in Newcastle upon Tyne, the third daughter of Edward Richardson (1806–1863) who was a tannery owner, and his wife Jane Wigham, in a family of seven daughters and four sons. The Richardson clan were a "close-knit Quaker family". John Wigham Richardson, born 1837, was her elder brother, and wrote in his memoirs of their father Edward "He was always more or less of an invalid".

=== Edward & James Richardson ===
The family leather business, Edward & James Richardson, was still in existence in 1969, when it was taken over by Barrow, Hepburn & Gale.

Edward Richardson (1806–1863) was the second son of Isaac Richardson, eldest son of the tanner John Richardson of Low Lights, North Shields and brother of William Richardson, partner in a Newcastle tannery with Jonathan Priestman. James Richardson was Edward's nephew, son of his brother John Richardson, and lived in Elswick, Newcastle, the long-term location of the business.

James's brother David Richardson (1835–1913) took over the management of the business, and was father of Lewis Fry Richardson; he brought in the chemist Henry Richardson Procter FRS to the works at Elswick. Procter was a family member, son of John Richardson Procter to whom the Low Lights tannery had passed.

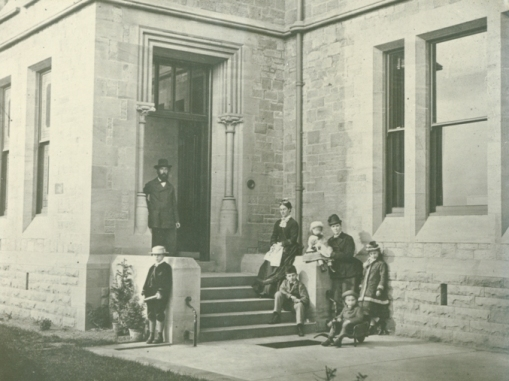
The Gables, Elswick Road, Newcastle upon Tyne, home of David Richardson, 1870s photograph

== Education ==
Elizabeth Richardson was educated at a Quaker school in Lewes, Sussex. This was the boarding school run by the Dymond sisters, where her elder sister Anna Deborah Richardson had already been a pupil; Elizabeth (Lizzie) went there in 1853, after some home tuition by Anna. Then she attended an art school in Newcastle where she was a student of William Bell Scott.

== Activism ==
=== Suffragist ===
In April 1884 Spence Watson organised an at-home meeting for the Manchester Society for Women's Suffrage; and, in another event that month, spoke with her sister Alice Mary Merz and others at a suffragist meeting. (Alice Mary Richardson had married John Theodore Merz, who with Robert Spence Watson, and six others, founded the Newcastle upon Tyne Electric Supply Company.) In 1886 she set up a Newcastle branch of the Women's Liberal Association, of which she became president. At the branch in 1887 she read a paper "A Summary of the Reforms Passed Since 1832", which was published. In 1890 she was on the council of the Women's Franchise League.

Making a comparison of "Christian suffragists" with Jane Elizabeth Strickland JP née Slade of Hastings, Inkpin wrote that Strickland was "a dedicated Christian feminist to whom her religious faith was a crucial element of her being", while Watson

is perhaps better regarded as [an] example of that strand of equal rights Victorian Liberalism, which had led her into many associated campaigns, and latterly into the presidency of her local suffrage society in Gateshead.

=== Pacifist ===
At the beginning of 1900, during the Second Anglo-Boer War, Elizabeth Spence Watson signed the manifesto of the Stop the War women's group led by Sarah Amos and Jane Cobden. Robert Spence Watson was approached by Rosalind Howard, Countess of Carlisle for support with the local peace campaign in the north-east, and Elizabeth was invited to speak at a women's peace event in London. In January 1900 Elizabeth was one of four conveners of a meeting in Liverpool Town Hall, of northern Women's Liberal Associations. An anti-war resolution drafted by Sarah Anne Byles, another of the conveners and wife of William Byles MP, was passed unanimously.

==== Cronwright-Schreiner in Gateshead ====
Samuel Cronwright-Schreiner, husband of Olive Schreiner, made a lecture tour in the United Kingdom in 1900, speaking against the war. On 9 March he was in Gateshead, where a "Stop the War" committee had George Kitchin as president. The previous day he had been in Dundee, attempting to speak with Keir Hardie at the Gilfillan Hall, but had been met with a hostile reception and was unable to proceed. Robert, who with Thomas Burt had spoken against the war at Newcastle Town Hall at a disrupted event, on the day was at Hexham addressing a literary society.

The Gateshead Town Hall event was ticket-only, for speeches by Kitchin and Cronwright-Schreiner; but opposition from local councillors meant pro-war protesters were briefed in advance, and were outside the Hall to ensure it did not take place. Elizabeth Spence Watson then decided to adjourn to her family home, Bensham Grove, for a meeting with the local committee. They were followed by pro-war protesters, with a band. The local press reported that "Dr Abraham marched the Gateshead Jingo crowd" in the direction of Bensham Lodge. Andrew Arthur Abraham, an Irish surgeon (LRCSI 1875) known also as an amateur cricketer, was at some point a Gateshead councillor, and was also a reserve surgeon-captain for the Durham Light Infantry.

Cronwright-Schreiner described that evening, with around 20 policemen guarding the Watson home. There were speeches made outside, including by Abraham. There were stones thrown at the house, causing some damage. Robert Spence Watson returned later.

== Alpine pioneer ==
The Watsons climbed during their 1863 honeymoon in Switzerland, in July. On 6 July with guides they made the first ascent of Balfrin. On 10 July they climbed the Jungfrau, and then experienced a brush discharge on the Aletsch Glacier. Elizabeth Spence Watson made the first female ascent of Ortler in 1867.

== Tasmania visit ==
Spence Watson was in Hobart, Tasmania in September 1913, and addressed a Woman's Christian Temperance Union meeting, speaking of the life of Josephine Butler. While there, she sketched, and climbed Mount Wellington.

== Family ==
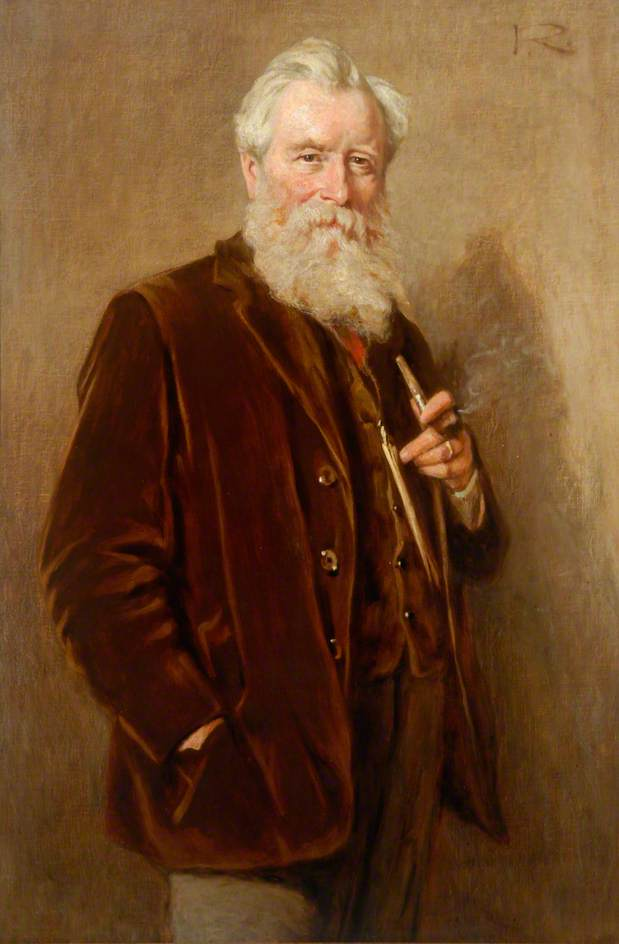
Robert Spence Watson, 20th century portrait

Elizabeth Richardson on 9 June 1863 married Robert Spence Watson at the Friends' meeting house, Pilgrim Street, Newcastle upon Tyne. Watson had been a contemporary of her brother John Wigham Richardson at John Collingwood Bruce's Newcastle school.

A description of their entry into "Newcastle drawing-rooms":

He with his splendid lion's head and golden mane, and she with her hair braided round her head in a coronet, when all the other mothers wore caps.

The couple had six children: see Robert Spence Watson#Family.

=== Anna Deborah Richardson ===
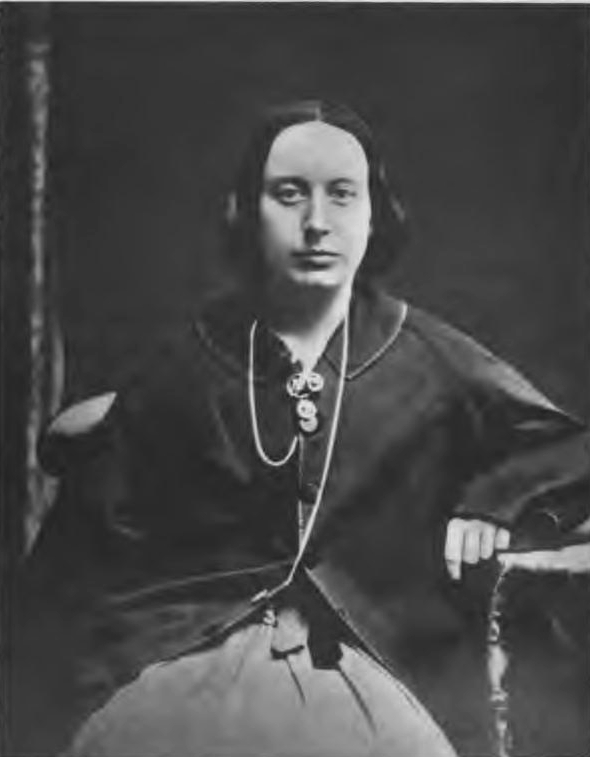
Anna Deborah Richardson, at age 25

Elizabeth's eldest sister Anna Deborah Richardson (1832–1872) knew Emily Davies, at Gateshead Rectory; she was on the local committee of the Society for Promoting the Employment of Women founded by Davies. They became good friends. In the period from 1867 to 1870, covering the efforts to found Girton College, Anna wrote to Davies a series of letters that include her views on fundraising. A chapter on this correspondence was included in the memoir of Anna Deborah, in which Elizabeth appears as Lizzie, written by their brother John Wigham Richardson.
