= Jonathan Priestman =

English Quaker businessman (1786–1863)

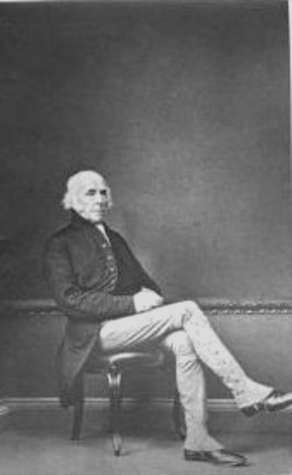
Jonathan Priestman

Jonathan Priestman (1786–1863) was an English Quaker businessman and minister in Newcastle upon Tyne. He was a major shareholder in the Consett Iron Company, a director of the Great North of England Railway, and one of the founders of the Northumberland and Durham District Bank that failed in 1857. He was the father of the reformers Margaret Tanner and Anna Maria Priestman, and father-in-law of the Radical politician John Bright.

== Life ==
He was born on 29 April 1786 at Malton, North Yorkshire, a younger son of David Priestman and his wife Elizabeth Taylor, a Quaker minister.

Priestman was educated at Ackworth School in 1800–1801. He was an apprentice in the family tanning business in Malton.

== Tanning business ==
David Priestman was the fifth of seven sons of John Priestman (born 1708), who learned tanning from William Richardson of Ayton in Cleveland, and his wife Ann Marshall of Aislaby. His sister Hannah married Henry Richardson (1740–1808) of Whitby.

Henry's brother John Richardson (1733–1800), a strict Quaker preferring to associate with others of the Society of Friends, had a tannery, in the Low Lights area of North Shields, near the staithes for coal. He was the father of the minister George Richardson, the fourth son.

John Richardson's tanyard passed on to his son Henry (died 1827), who adopted some of the orphaned children of the marriage of his sister Elizabeth (died 1820) to Joseph Procter (died 1817), so that the business came into the Procter family. Other family members developed a Newcastle tannery, in the Newgate area.

Jonathan Priestman moved to Newcastle in 1808, to work as a tanner with his Richardson cousins. Around 1812 Priestman went into partnership with William Richardson, as leather dressers. William Richardson (born 1771) was the third son of John Richardson, and married as his first wife Sarah Priestman of York. In 1827 Richardson & Priestman were in business at 66a Newgate Street, Newcastle, as tanners and other trades. In 1834, Priestman's bark mill on Low Friar Street, making the tanning agent, burned down.

A Tanneries Directory for 1867 shows Priestman & Son in Newcastle, J. & J. Priestman in Malton, and John Richardson Procter at Lowlights, North Shields, with Edward & James Richardson at Elswick.

== Later life ==
In 1848 Priestman bought Benwell House.

== Banking ==
At the time of the panic of 1857, the Northumberland & Durham District Bank, in which Priestman was one of the founding shareholders in 1836, suffered suspension of payments and financial collapse. There were major repercussions for local industry, and in the Quaker community.

Priestman then played a part in transitional arrangements. Initially a private bank trading as Hawks, Grey, Priestman & Co. was set up by a group of the shareholders. It proved untenable in the light of the liquidation process of the failed bank. Priestman then took the initiative of bringing in the bankers Thomas Hodgkin and John William Pease (1836–1901) of the Pease family, both Quakers. The resulting bank Hodgkin, Barnett, Pease and Spence & Co., set up in 1859, achieved stability. The industrial consequences included the revival of the Derwent & Consett Iron Company, which went under with the Northumberland & Durham, as the Consett Iron Company.

== Associations and interests ==
Priestman was a temperance campaigner, the first President of Newcastle's Moderation Temperance Society. He had interests in the Castle Garth infant schools, and the orphanage in Newcastle's Brunswick Square. In 1823 he was on the committee of an abolitionist group, the Newcastle-upon-Tyne Society for promoting the Gradual Abolition of Slavery. He joined the national committee of the League of Universal Brotherhood, a peace movement, and was on the Newcastle committee for the British and Foreign Bible Society. At the end of his life he was concerned with relief for the Lancashire Cotton Famine, and Lincoln's Emancipation Proclamation.

In his early years in Newcastle, Priestman kept up an extensive correspondence with his Richardson cousins. Letters survive to him from Elizabeth and Hannah Richardson, two of the younger daughters of Henry Richardson and Hannah Priestman, his first cousins. Priestman sent them copies of Samuel Taylor Coleridge's weekly The Friend, and extracts from the Eclectic Review about Anna Seward's work. He subscribed to The Friend through Coleridge's supporter William Wray, an attorney in Malton.

== Family ==
Priestman married Rachel Bragg (1791–1854) in 1814. She was one of two daughters of Hadwen Bragg (died 1823) from Cumberland, a draper in Newcastle who married Margaret Wilson, a Quaker minister. The columnist "W. W. W." (Old Newcastle Tradesmen) stated that Priestman was known as the "handsome Quaker". The couple had six daughters and three sons. Rachel died in 1854, on a visit she made with Jonathan to Irish Quakers, at the home of the minister Richard Allen (died 1873) outside Waterford.

- Their daughter Lucy married John Bright in 1839, and died in 1841; she was mother of Helen Priestman Bright, born in 1840.

Of the sons, David, born 1824, died young in 1825.

- Hadwen Bragg Priestman (1820–1884) married in 1860 Emily Jane Slagg.
- Jonathan Priestman II (1825–1888) married in 1852 Lucy Ann Richardson, daughter of Jonathan Richardson (1802–1871) and his wife Ann Robson.

=== Jonathan Priestman II ===
Priestman's engagement to Anna Deborah Richardson, eldest sister of Elizabeth Spence Watson who married his close friend Robert Spence Watson, was broken off in 1850. Their father was Edward Richardson (1806–1863), leather manufacturer, the second son of Isaac Richardson, eldest son of John Richardson of Lowlights and brother of John Priestman I's partner William Richardson. They were therefore close relations, unlike Priestman's wife Lucy Ann Richardson. Her family had originally been in Kingston-upon-Hull, moving to Whitby and then Sunderland. Her family home was in Benfieldside. The couple had two sons and three daughters.

The affairs and failure of the Northumberland & Durham District Bank were of concern to the younger Jonathan Priestman, since his father-in-law Jonathan Richardson had been its original manager in 1836, and then a director. The impact of the failure on the local Quaker community was serious: the Newcastle Meeting investigated the conduct of six Friends closely connected with the bank, Jonathan Richardson was singled out for blame in the press, and his children, apart from Lucy Ann, resigned from the Meeting. Her husband Jonathan Priestman II suffered financially, having to leave his house at Shotley Bridge and move with his family back to the family home in Benwell.

In 1864, Priestman was appointed joint managing director of the newly-formed Consett Iron Works company, with David Dale. Subsequently, he was a coalowner.
