= Margaret Tanner =

English social reformer (1817–1905)

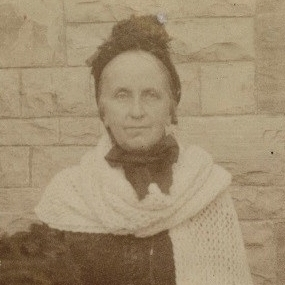
- Born: Margaret Priestman; 25 October 1817; Newcastle upon Tyne, England
- Died: 1905 (aged 87–88)
- Known for: leading suffragist

Margaret Tanner (née Priestman, 25 October 1817 – 1905) was an English social reformer. Priestman, along with members of hers and the Bright family, were important in the creation of some of the first women's suffrage societies, founded in London, Bristol, and Bath.

== Life ==
Tanner was born in Newcastle upon Tyne in 1817. She was one of the nine children of the Quaker couple, Rachel (born Bragg) and Jonathan Priestman. Her father was a wealthy tanner in Newcastle upon Tyne and her mother (1791–1854) was a travelling minister in the Society of Friends. Her maternal grandmother was Margaret Wilson who had also been a Quaker minister. They lived in the Summerhill district of Newcastle.

== Career ==
Tanner and members of hers and the Bright family, were important in the creation of some of the first women's suffrage societies, founded in London, Bristol, and Bath.

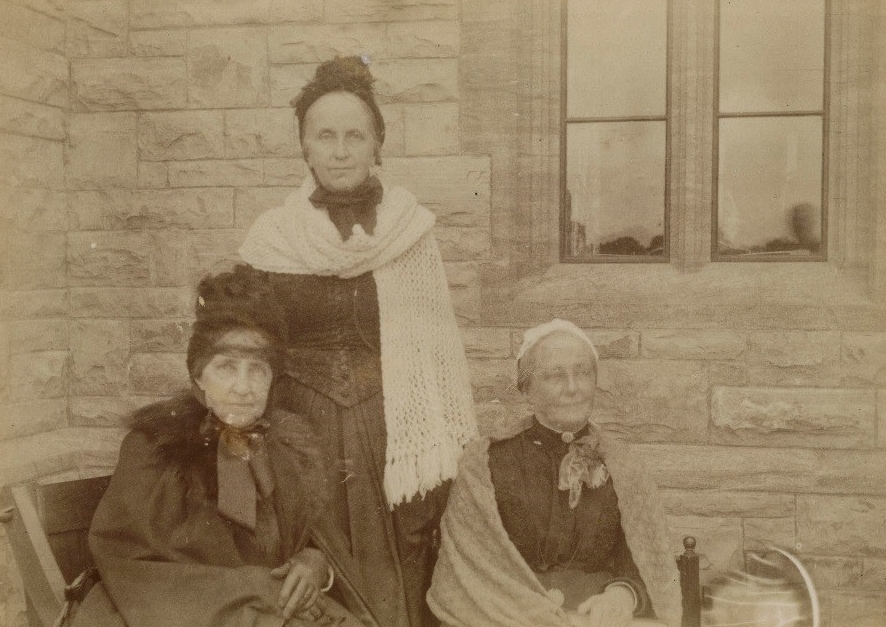
Anna Maria, Margaret (Tanner) and Mary Priestman in 1891

Tanner was a supporter of the Ladies National Association for the Repeal of the Contagious Diseases Acts, which was formed in 1870 by Josephine Butler to protest against legislation which undermined the civil rights of those who had been designated prostitutes by the authorities in particular naval and military towns. Her sister Mary Priestman was the secretary of this organization and another sister Anna Priestman was a member. All three sisters supported international campaigns against the government's regulation of prostitution, and continued their family's close association with the temperance movement. Margaret was President of the Western Temperance League.

In 1839, her sister Elizabeth married the politician John Bright and they had one daughter, Helen Priestman Bright, the following year. Elizabeth died from tuberculosis on 10 September 1841. Bright had visited her often but it was Margaret who provided her day to day care. Elizabeth's requests included that Helen Priestman Bright should be brought up by her larger family and Margaret remained in contact with her.

In 1866 Tanner and her sisters signed the petition raised in support of women getting the vote. In 1869 her husband died and in the following year her sisters Anna Maria and Mary moved south to live with her.

Tanner was among the signatories of a supportive letter sent to the first meeting of the International Council of Women, which was held in 1888 in America. Other signers included Helen Priestman Bright Clark, Maria Colby, Emily Sturge, Mary Estlin and Louisa Swann, all under the title "In the Fellowship of Womanhood."

== Death and legacy ==
Tanner died in 1905. Her photographs, papers, diaries, and her correspondence and material related to Margaret Clark Gillett, Alice Clark, Helen Priestman Bright, Priscilla Bright McLaren and Anna Maria Priestman are recorded in the National Archives. Her two sisters and housemates went on to join the suffragettes and died in 1914.

== Personal life ==
She first married in 1846 to Daniel Wheeler who was a fellow Quaker and they lived in Bristol. Daniel died in 1848 and she remarried to Arthur Tanner in 1855 who was involved with a family timber firm.
