= C&J =

C&J or C & J may refer to:

- Clean and jerk, a composite of two weightlifting movements; the clean and the jerk, most often performed with a barbell
- Cutfather & Joe, a Danish record production and remixing duo, sometimes credited as C&J or C & J on music releases
- C. & J. Clark, a British shoe manufacturer and retailer known as Clarks
