= Strachey love letter algorithm =

Circa 1952 word-replacement algorithm for doggerel poetry

In 1952, Christopher Strachey wrote a combinatory algorithm for the Manchester Mark 1 computer which could create love letters. The poems it generated have been seen as the first work of electronic literature and a queer critique of heteronormative expressions of love.

== History ==
Alan Turing's biographer Andrew Hodges dates the creation of the love letter generator, also known as M.U.C., to the summer of 1952, when Strachey was working with Turing, although Gaboury dates its creation to 1953. Hodges writes that while many of their colleagues thought M.U.C. silly, “it greatly amused Alan and Christopher Strachey – whose love lives, as it happened, were rather similar too”. Strachey was known to be gay.

Although this appears to be the first work of computer-generated literature, the structure is similar to the nineteenth-century parlour game Consequences, and the early twentieth-century surrealist game exquisite corpse. The Mad Libs books were conceived around the same time as Strachey wrote the love letter generator.

It was also preceded by John Clark's Latin Verse Machine (1830-1843), the first automated text generator.

== Output ==
In a 1954 paper, Strachey gave one of just a few extant examples of the kinds of love letter the program would generate:

Darling Sweetheart,

You are my avid fellow feeling. My affection curiously clings to your passionate wish. My liking yearns for your heart. You are my wistful sympathy: my tender liking.

Yours beautifully

M. U. C.

The original program is lost, but was reimplemented by Nick Montfort in 2014. In an article on the love letter generator in the New Yorker the structure of each letter is described thus: "you are my [adjective] [noun]. my [adjective] [noun] [adverb] [verbs] your [adjective] [noun]."

== The algorithm ==
Rather than modeling writing as a creative process, the love letter algorithm represents the writing of love letters as formulaic and without creativity. The algorithm has the following structure:

1. Print two words taken from a list of salutations
2. Do the following 5 times:
  1. Choose one of two sentence structures depending on a random value Rand
  2. Fill the sentence structure from lists of adjectives, adverbs, substantives, and verbs.
3. Print the letter's closing

The lists of words were compiled by Strachey from a Roget's Thesaurus. Although the list of words included several variations on the word love, none of these variations made it into any of the widely circulated letters generated by Strachey's procedure.

== Reception ==
Strachey wrote about his interest in how “a rather simple trick” can produce an illusion that the computer is thinking, and that “these tricks can lead to quite unexpected and interesting results”.

Jacob Gaboury argues that the love letter generator exposes the impersonality of love, showing that "the false veneer lying at the heart of that most deeply human emotion is pure camp: an exultant love of the artificial".
