= Margaret Clark Gillett =

British botanist (1878-1962)

Margaret Clark Gillett (1878–1962) was a British botanist, suffragist and social reformer.

== Family ==
Gillett was born in 1878. She was the daughter of William Stephens Clark and his wife Helen Priestman Bright, and was the sister of Alice Clark and Hilda Clark. Her maternal grandfather was the radical Member of Parliament John Bright, from the Bright family of political activists and pioneers of the women's rights movement.

In February 1909 she married banker Arthur Bevington Gillett (1875–1954).

== Activism ==
Gillett advocated for women and children held in concentration camps following the Boer War. She was also a suffragist, along with her mother, sisters and brother.

== Botany ==
Gillet was also a botanist. The standard author abbreviation Gillett is used to indicate this person as the author when citing a botanical name.
