= Maria Colby =

English suffragist

- Occupation: Suffragist
- Organization(s): Women's Social and Political Union; Bristol and West of England Society for Women's Suffrage; Women's Liberal Federation

Maria Colby was an English suffragist and was one of the early campaigners for women's enfranchisement. She was later a member of the Women's Social and Political Union (WSPU) and the Bristol and West of England Society for Women's Suffrage.

== Activism ==
Colby was an early campaigner for women's suffrage in England. On 10 December 1880, Colby participated in a meeting held by Cheltenham's newly elected Member of Parliament, Charles de Ferrieres, which drew up a memorial for the British Prime Minister William Gladstone urging for the vote to be granted to women. The memorial argued that women being denied the vote on the basis of their sex was "directly opposed to the fundamental principle of representative government."

Colby co-organized the Birmingham Grand Demonstration in support of women's suffrage with Harriet McIlquham, which was held on 22 February 1881. In 1883, Colby organised women's suffrage meetings on Durdham Downs in Bristol for 22 consecutive evenings.

Colby was among the signatories of a supportive letter sent to the first meeting of the International Council of Women, which was held in 1888 in America. Other signers included Margaret Tanner, Helen Priestman Bright Clark, Emily Sturge, Mary Estlin and Louisa Swann, all under the title "In the Fellowship of Womanhood."

The Women's Social and Political Union (WSPU)'s Bristol branch was opened by Annie Kenney in 1907 and Colby joined as a member. She was also a member of the Bristol and West of England Society for Women's Suffrage, later becoming a paid organiser for the society.

Colby campaigned for women's enfranchisement by knocking on doors in the working-class area of St Philip's and St Jacob's in Bristol and "became so weary of objections to women's suffrage, based on the idea that the primary duty of women is to darn stockings" that she placed an advertisement for a holey-socked man to marry in a local paper:

Wanted – A postman to marry, who walks with might, Or policeman on duty by day and night, Or telegraph racer with heels of horn, Who'll bring me daily some stockings to darn

Colby was also a member of the Women's Liberal Federation, an organisation linked to the Liberal Party.

== Personal life ==
Colby had a daughter named Cordelia Colby who was also active in the local women's suffrage movement.
