= The Eureka =

Machine for generating Latin verses

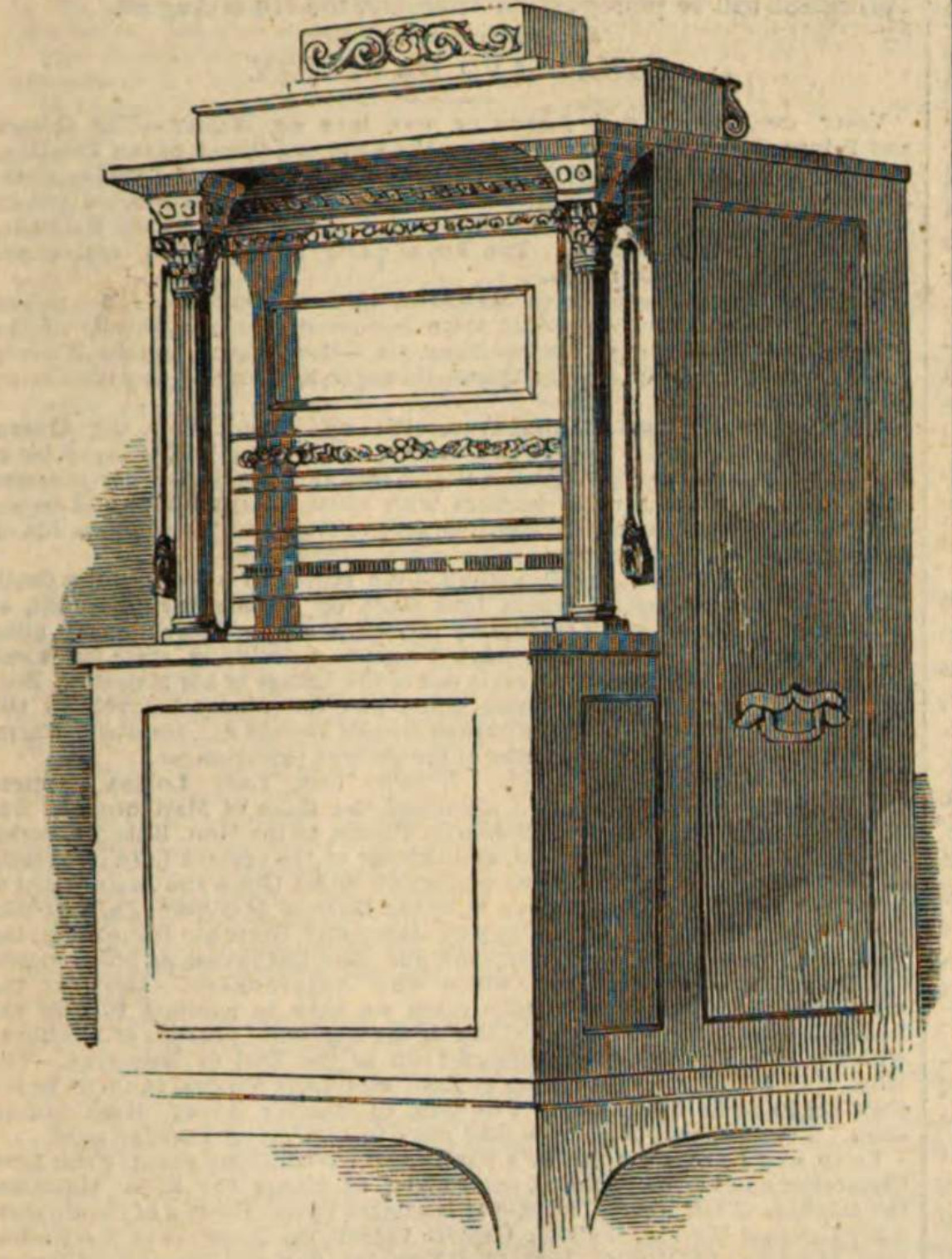
The Eureka.

The Eureka, also known as the Latin Verse Machine, is a 19th-century invention that mechanically generated Latin hexameter. It was built from 1830 to 1845 by a grocer and printing shop worker named John Clark, who then exhibited his invention in the Egyptian Hall in London. For an admission price of one shilling, visitors could watch the "small bureau bookcase" produce a new verse of Latin hexameter in about a minute. The Eureka played God Save the King while running, and went silent when the verse was complete. Output from the machine included horrida sponsa reis promittunt tempora densa ("horrible brides promise tough times") and sontia tela bonis causabunt agmina crebra ("good weapons will cause frequent raids").

== Verse production ==
The verses created by the Eureka were gloomy and oracular hexameters, created to a single format, which allowed for many combinations, all metrically sound and (more or less) meaningful.

| Word 1 | Word 2 | Word 3 | Word 4 | Word 5 | Word 6 |
|---|---|---|---|---|---|
| dactyl | trochee | iamb | molossus | dactyl | trochee |
| adjective, neuter plural nominative (or accusative) | noun, neuter plural nominative (or accusative) | adverb (or parenthesis) | verb, third person plural | noun, neuter plural accusative (or nominative) | adjective, neuter plural accusative (or nominative) |

This method of verse creation was not Clark’s invention: already in 1677 a John Peter had published a work, "Artificial Versifying, A New Way to Make Latin Verses". Clark’s contribution was to fully automate this process.

The mechanism was a series of six drums turning at different rates within the cabinet. The words were not simply printed on the drums, but encoded as rows of stop wires of different lengths, onto which wooden staves would be dropped. The staves had any letters that might be needed printed on them in a vertical series, and would fall onto the stop wires with the desired letter opposite the window for the word.

Clark described his machine as an illustration of a theory of “kaleidoscopic evolution” whereby the Latin verse is “conceived in the mind of the machine” then mechanically produced and displayed. Clark can be regarded as a pioneer of cognitive science and computational creativity.

== Reception ==
At the time, the Latin Verse Machine was viewed as a curiosity. A writer in the Athenæum wrote, "I do not see its immediate utility; but, as something curious, it is, perhaps, entitled to take its place with Babbage's Calculating Machine, and inventions of that class."

In the 2020s, the machine has been discussed as a precursor to electronic literature, and in particular as an early example of computer-generated poetry.

== Legacy ==
After Clark’s death in 1853, the machine passed first to his nephew and then to his cousins Cyrus and James Clark. After it was repaired in 1950 after a period of neglect, it was housed in the Records Office of Clarks’ factory in Street, Somerset. It was later moved to the company's Shoe Museum, but was put into storage in 1996 when it was no longer working. It was renovated in 2015. Since the Shoe Museum closed, the Latin Verse Machine has been in the care of the Alfred Gillett Trust.

== See also ==
- Generative literature
- Strachey love letter algorithm
