= Lance Clark =

English shoemaker and businessman (1936–2018)

Lancelot P. Clark
- Born: 30 April 1936; Street, Somerset, United Kingdom
- Died: 27 February 2018 (aged 81)
- Occupations: Shoemaker and businessman
- Known for: Majority owner of Clarks shoes

Lancelot Pease Clark (30 April 1936 – 27 February 2018), was an English shoemaker, businessman, and member of the Clark family, which is the majority owner of shoe retailer Clarks which they had founded in the 1820s.

== Career ==
Clark was born in Street, Somerset, into the sixth generation of the Clarks shoemaking family.

He was educated at Leighton Park School and New College, Oxford. While working in the family business, he was managing director of Clarks UK, prior to the business being placed under non-family management. He is credited with the creation of the Wallabee shoe in 1965. After retiring from Clarks, Clark went on to work with the Edward Green and Terra Plana shoe brands.

As of 2017, the Clark family still owned more than 80 per cent of the company, according to The Sunday Times. Lancelot Clark's branch of the family collectively owned about 25 per cent.

In 2008, Clark set up ethical footwear brand Soul of Africa, which raises money for South African orphans who have lost their parents to AIDS.

== Personal life ==
Based in Street, Somerset, for much of his life, Clark was a painter. He had seven children in total.
