= John Clark (inventor) =

19th-century British inventor

- Born: 21 November 1785; Greinton, England
- Died: 23 May 1853 (aged 67); Bridgwater, England
- Occupations: Inventor and printer
- Notable work: Latin Verse Machine

John Clark (21 November 1785 – 23 May 1853) was an English printer and inventor who created the first automated text generator, the Latin Verse Machine (also known as the Eureka) between 1830 and 1843. Clark also patented a method for rubberising cloth that was used for air beds.

== Life ==
John Clark was born on 21 November 1785 and died on 23 May 1853. He was a cousin of Cyrus and James Clark, who founded the shoe manufacturing company C. & J. Clark, still doing business as Clark. Initially a grocer, he later became a printer. He was a member of the Bridgewater Quaker community.

== Air beds ==
In 1813 Clark registered a patent for air-tight beds, pillows and cushions. In an article for the Furniture History Society, Edward Joy wrote that this was the first such patent, and that Clark used "unvulcanized rubber filled by means of an air pump." Clark's patent describes various uses for the new technique, including for beds, which would not require stuffing materials other than air. The air pump could be kept beneath the bed. For medical uses, the bed could also be filled with hot steam or cold water, allowing for a variety of temperatures. Although a physician used Clark's invention to make a water bed for invalids, there was no widespread adoption of air beds or water beds at this time, largely due to more complicated maintenance than the more common stuffed beds, and because spring beds became popular.

He patented a waterproof material (patent 3718 of 1813). His niece wrote that he sold the patent to Charles Macintosh who used it for his raincoats, although this may have been a misunderstanding on his niece's part.

He also devised a fire-escape, an economising grate, and a printing device for the blind to write messages.

== Latin Verse Machine ==
Between 1830 and 1843 Clark constructed a machine that could generate a new line of Latin hexameter verse every minute. He exhibited the machine at the Egyptian Hall in Piccadilly, London, during the spring of 1845.

The Latin Verse Machine is the first automated text generator, and a pioneering work of generative art and generative literature. It is a remarkable precursor of the genre of electronic literature, although it is of course mechanical rather than electronic. Clark's machine predates the first electronic text generator (Christopher Strachey's love letter generator) by more than a century. Clark's comparison of his text generator to the contemporary kaleidoscope is evidence of a theoretical interest in generative art and literature.

The Latin Verse Machine has also been seen as a critique of prosody and the teaching of Latin in 19th century Britain.

== Author and printer ==
Clark was a printer in Bridgwater and also published a number of works that he wrote himself.

These include:

- The Avalonian Guide to the town of Glastonbury, and its Environs. This guide book was published in several editions. The 1835 edition has been digitised by Google Books.
- The General History and Description of a Machine for Composing Hexameter Latin Verses. Clark published two editions of this 28 page pamphlet describing his Latin Verse Machine, in 1837 and 1843. Oiginals are held by the Alfred Gillett Trust in Street, Somerset, UK.
- Don Juan. Canto XVII (1827) This was a continuation of Lord Byron's satiric poem Don Juan.
