= Robert Spence Watson =

The Right Honourable Robert Spence Watson
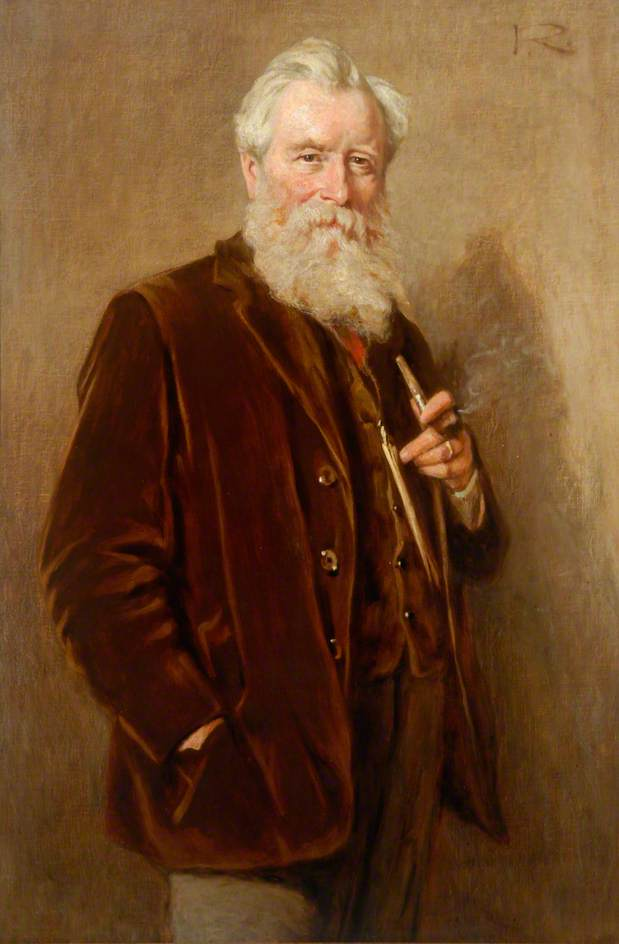

President of the Liberal Party
- Preceded by: James Kitson
- Succeeded by: Augustine Birrell

Personal details
- Born: 8 June 1837 Gateshead, County Durham, England
- Died: 11 March 1911 (aged 73)

Robert Spence Watson (8 June 1837 – 2 March 1911) was an English solicitor, reformer, politician and writer. He became noted for pioneering labour arbitrations. While refusing invitations to stand for Parliament, he was an influential figure in the Liberal Party throughout his later life.

== Life and career ==
He was born in Gateshead, County Durham, the second child of Joseph Watson (1806–1874), an attorney, and his wife Sarah Spence; his parents were Quakers. He was the eldest of five sons, in a family where there were also seven daughters. The eldest daughter Lucy married in 1859 Alexander Corder, and their son Percy was Robert's biographer, as well as a partner in the family law firm.

Watson received his secondary education at Bootham School, York and began studying at University College London in 1853; he did not complete his degree there. He returned to the North East and was articled to his father.

In 1860 Watson became a solicitor. He went into practice with his father's firm, under the name J. & R. S. Watson; he remained in legal practice for the rest of his life. In 1995 a blue commemorative plaque was erected outside his home.

== Liberal Party politics ==
Watson's father was a liberal radical. Robert Spence Watson acted as political agent for Joseph Cowen in 1873, ahead of the 1874 general election. Cowen, in parliament from 1874 to 1886, was elected on a Liberal tide in the North of England but identified as a Radical. Watson also became close to Joseph Chamberlain, as they and others worked in the mid-1870s to set up the National Liberal Federation (NLF). This was a point of difference, however, with Cowen, who disliked the caucus or party machine system the NLF was designed to provide.

At the beginning of 1883, Newcastle Member of Parliament Ashton Wentworth Dilke was in bad health. Watson had prepared the ground with John Morley, and when Dilke resigned his seat, Morley entered the selection process with some assurances that he would not be opposed by Joseph Cowen. The assurances, however, turned out to be poorly founded. Cowen, who had been campaigning against the policies of William Gladstone, did not endorse Morley; who was though elected in the by-election over the Tory Gainsford Bruce with the "commanding influence" of Watson behind him. Cowen failed to get Lowthian Bell to run, and his candidate Elijah Copland gained little traction despite support from Cowen's newspapers. Moisey Ostrogorsky wrote (English translation 1902) of the proceedings:

The desired effect of the fait accompli, intended to discourage any other serious candidature, was produced, and the candidate of the Caucus was elected. Encouraged by this success, the Caucus became still more intolerant and intractable with regard to its grievances against the too independent member.

D. A. Hamer, in his biography of Morley, concluded that Ostrogorsky's allegations amounted to saying that Morley had been used in a plot to reduce Cowen's influence. In 1885 Watson was in the group of leading Liberals lobbying Morley to campaign against British involvement in the Mahdist War, against Chamberlain's view.

Watson was president of the Newcastle Liberal and Radical Association from 1884 to 1897. In 1890 he was elected president of the NLF, succeeding Sir James Kitson. In seconding the proposal of Watson, Henry Joseph Wilson mentioned that Watson had been nominated sole arbiter of 30 major trade disputes; the Oxford Dictionary of National Biography gives the figure of 47 disputes in industry in the north of England to 1894. His work as arbitrator was voluntary. Watson held the presidency until 1902.

In the divisive period after the Fourth Gladstone ministry ended in 1894, Watson worked closely with T. E. Ellis, Herbert Gladstone and Robert Arundell Hudson, the NLF secretary, to position the NLF as an open forum rather than a thinktank. Watson himself came out clearly at the end of 1897 against the legacy of Palmerston and jingoism, stating at the Birmingham NLF meeting that the Liberal Party "would never wrap themselves in the filthy rag of a spirited foreign policy".

== Charity and education ==
From the time of his return to Newcastle from London, Watson was involved with rescue work among street children through the local Shoeblack Brigade. This was a charitable cause particularly promoted by the Newcastle solicitor Edward Glynn; Glynn worked with the Gateshead police officer John Elliott, a former Chartist. By the 1860s Watson and his wife were involved in managing the Newcastle Industrial and Ragged School. Watson was a long-term secretary of the school, for many year jointly with John Thompson Oliver.

In 1862 Watson became Secretary to the Literary and Philosophical Society of Newcastle upon Tyne and held that position for 31 years. His work led to the Society accumulating the largest independent library outside London. At the Society, Watson ran adult education campaigns, featuring the songs of Joe Wilson.

Watson helped to found the Durham College of Science in 1871, one of the group of Newcastle worthies around William Lake; it was later to become Armstrong College, and so part of Newcastle University. Watson became the first independent president of Armstrong College in 1910, taking over from George Kitchin who had held the post ex officio as Dean of Durham. He was instrumental in the founding of the Newcastle Free Public Library.

== Activism ==
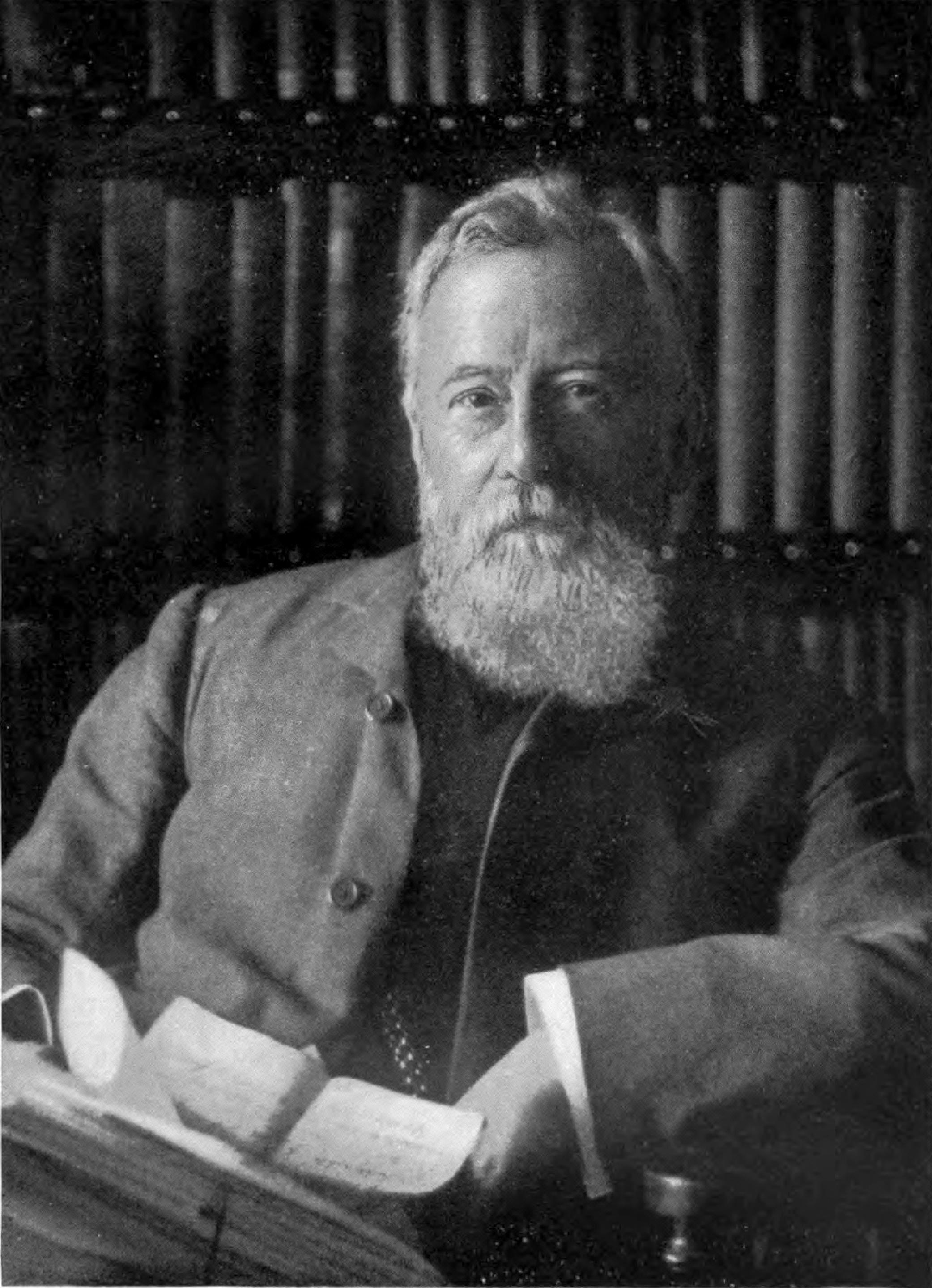
Watson, in Proceedings of the Tenth Universal Peace Congress, 1902

Watson was impressed by an 1889 lecture by Sergey Kravchinsky. From 1890 till 1911, he was the president of the Society of Friends of Russian Freedom. Initially it was sparsely supported, the first recruits apart from the Watsons being the MPs Thomas Burt and William Byles. In the society's printed organ Free Russia, Joseph Frederick Green reviewed the pamphlet Nihilism As It Is to which Watson had contributed an introduction. The revolutionary David Soskice (1866–1941) settled in the United Kingdom in 1898; he became editor of Free Russia around 1904. After the Bloody Sunday (1905) incident in Russia, Watson had to make clear that his Quaker and pacifist beliefs were not compatible with fundraising for arms. In 1907 Watson with Lord Coleridge defended Vladimir Burtsev, charged in London with incitement to murder.

In 1897 Watson published The History of English Rule and Policy in South Africa, and he joined the South Africa Conciliation Committee.

Watson was a member of the Peace Society, and his anti-war views during the Second Anglo-Boer War saw Bensham Grove attacked. After the death in 1903 of Sir Joseph Pease, 1st Baronet, president of the Peace Society, the position was seen as a poisoned chalice, with Leonard Courtney declining it, followed by six others. Watson accepted it.

== Works ==
Watson was a prolific author, publishing mostly on education, politics and industry.

=== Travel ===
- The Villages around Metz (1870). Watson travelled to Alsace-Lorraine in 1870 to support Quaker relief work in the wake of the Franco-Prussian War, having raised £70,000.

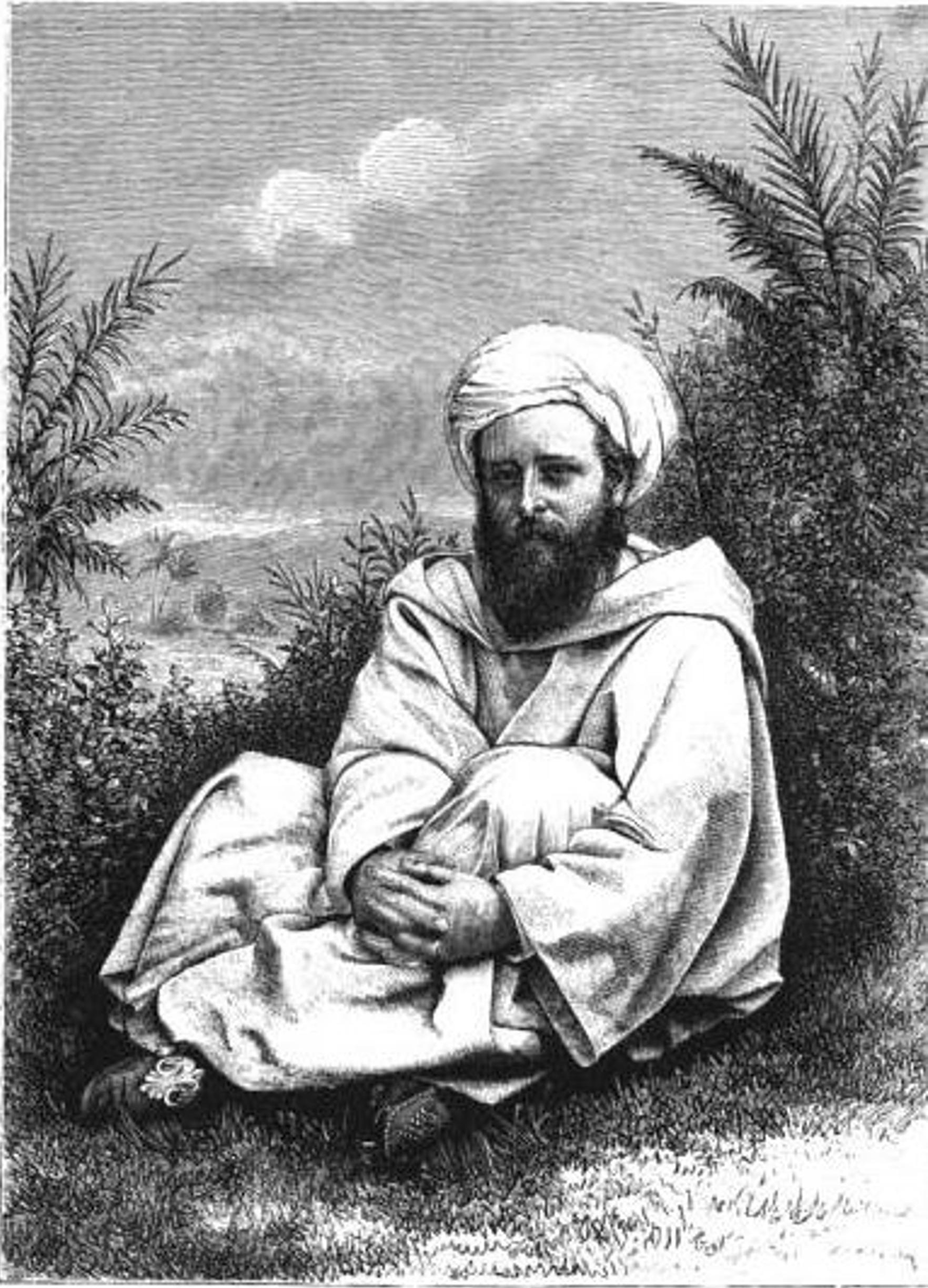
A Visit to Wazan: "The Author in Moorish Dress"

- A Visit to Wazan: The Sacred City of Morocco (1880). Watson in 1879 visited the pilgrimage site Ouazzane in Morocco, with help from John Drummond Hay. Its sharif Abd es-Salam had in 1873 married, in Tangier, the British woman Emily Keene, the ceremony being carried out by Drummond Hay. The book was welcomed by The Westminster Review as an alternative to the account by Friedrich Gerhard Rohlfs; but the reviewer in The Athenæum was critical of it as superficial.

Watson was a mountaineer and a member of the Alpine Club, making his first Alpine climb in 1861 with Henry Tuke Mennell. He wrote in 1863 in the first volume of the Alpine Journal about his ascent with his wife of the Balfrinhorn.

=== Poetry ===
- Cædmon, the first English poet (1875)
- "Northumbrian Story and Song" in Lectures Delivered to the Literary and Philosophical Society, Newcastle-upon-Tyne, on Northumbrian History, Literature, and Art (1898), with Thomas Hodgkin, Richard Oliver Heslop and Richard Welford.
- Joseph Skipsey: His Life and Work (1909), T. Fisher Unwin, London. Joseph Skipsey was a coal miner and poet supported over a long period by Watson, who became a family friend.

Watson published two books of his own verse, Waifs and Strays (1864) including poems by his father, and Wayside Gleanings (1880). His song "The Life Brigade" was set to music by Thomas Haswell. Carols "The Children's Christmas" were published set to music by Myles Birket Foster III (1851–1922).

=== Family history ===
Watson left a manuscript biography of his ancestor Robert Foster (1754–1827), published in A Historical Sketch of the Society of Friends in Newcastle and Gateshead (1899), edited by John William Steel.

=== Education and the Literary and Philosophical Society ===
- Industrial Schools (1867)
- A Plan for Making the Society more extensively useful, as an educational institution (1868)
- "The Best Method of providing Higher Education in Boroughs", Social Science Association paper published 1871
- Education in Newcastle-upon-Tyne (1884)
- The Relations of Labour to Higher Education (1884)
- The History of the Literary and Philosophical Society of Newcastle-upon-Tyne (1793–1896) (1897)

=== Industry and industrial relations ===
- Boards of Conciliation and Arbitration and Sliding Scales (1886)
- The Peaceable Settlement of Labour Disputes (1889)
- Labour, Past, Present and Future (1889)
- The Recent History of Industrial Progress (1891)
- Introduction to When I was a Child (1906), autobiography by "An Old Potter" (Charles Shaw); Watson dealt in it with the topic of child labour.

=== Politics, colonial and foreign policy ===
- The history of English rule and policy in South Africa (1879) J. Forster, Newcastle upon Tyne.
- Irish Land Law Reform (1881)
- The Proper Limits of Obedience to the Law (1887)
- England's Dealings with Ireland (1887)
- Indian National Congresses (1888)
- The Duties of Citizenship (1895)
- The National Liberal Federation: From Its Commencement to the General Election of 1906 (1907)
- The Reform of the Land Laws (1906)
- Introduction to Nihilism as it is: Being Stepniak's Pamphlets and Felix Volkhovsky's "Claims of the Russian Liberals" (1910), apologetics for the Socialist Revolutionary Party under the name Russian Revolutionary Party

== Honours, awards and memberships ==
Watson was awarded an honorary LL.D. by the University of St Andrews in 1881, and an honorary D.C.L. by the University of Durham in 1906. He was created a member of the Privy Council of the United Kingdom in 1907, by Prime Minister Campbell-Bannerman; as a concession to his Quaker views, he did not wear a ceremonial sword as he was sworn in.

== Family ==
On 9 June 1863 Watson married Elizabeth Richardson at the Friends' meeting house, Pilgrim Street, Newcastle upon Tyne. In July they were in Switzerland, and on 6 July with guides they made the first ascent of Balfrin.

The couple had six children:

- Mabel, eldest daughter, married in 1896 Hugh Richardson of Sadberge.
- Ruth (died 1914), married in 1912 Edmund Innes Gower, schoolmaster.
- Evelyn, married 1898 Frederick Ernest Weiss.
- Mary, married 1904 Francis Edward Pollard of Bootham School.
- Bertha, married 1902 John Bowes Morrell.

Arnold, the only son, died in 1897.

Mabel Weiss, Watson's granddaughter, donated papers to Newcastle University, where they became the Spence Watson/Weiss Archive. This was in addition to a donation of books made in 1908 by Watson, now the Spence Watson Collection. William Bowes Morrell, a grandson, loaned papers of Watson to Parliament in 1973.

Party political offices
Preceded by James Kitson	President of the National Liberal Federation; 1890–1902	Succeeded by Augustine Birrell
