= Clarks (shoe retailer) =

British shoe manufacturer and retailer

C. and J. Clark International Limited
- Logo used since 2000
- Trade name: Clarks
- Formerly: Somervell Brothers Limited (1915–1976); K Shoemakers Limited (1976–1986); CJC (UK) Limited (1986–1988)
- Type: Limited company
- Industry: Retail
- Founded: Street, England (1825; 201 years ago)
- Founder: Cyrus Clark; James Clark
- Headquarters: Street, Somerset, England
- Area served: Worldwide
- Key people: Victor Herrero (Acting CEO)
- Products: Footwear
- Brands: Clarks Kids Clarks Originals Cloudsteppers
- Revenue: ▼£901.3 million (2024)
- Operating income: ▼£(18.1) million (2024)
- Net income: ▼£(39.3) million (2024)
- Owner: Viva Goods Company Limited (51%); Clark family (49%)
- Number of employees: 13,000+
- Parent: Viva Goods Company Limited
- Website: clarks.com

C. & J. Clark International Limited (trading as Clarks) is a British footwear manufacturer and retailer founded in 1825 by Cyrus Clark in Street, Somerset, where its headquarters remain. As of October 2023, the brand has 320 stores in the United Kingdom and Ireland, and hundreds of franchises located in the Americas, Europe and the Asia Pacific. The company also sells through third-party distribution.

The Clarks brand is best known for its Desert Boot and Wallabee shoes, as well as its collection of school shoes, particularly for children aged 4–12 years.

Clarks manufactured its products in the United Kingdom until 2005, when it began moving some production to the Far East. The company closed its last domestic factory in 2019 as it reported a £84.4 million loss. In November 2020, it was announced that Clarks would be rescued by the Hong Kong-based private equity firm LionRock Capital, and would enter a company voluntary arrangement. The deal meant the company would be out of the Clark family's control for the first time in its history. In February 2023, LionRock Capital sold its remaining indirect stake in Clarks to Viva China Holdings Limited.

== History ==
=== 1825–1862 – Rugs, slippers and prizes ===
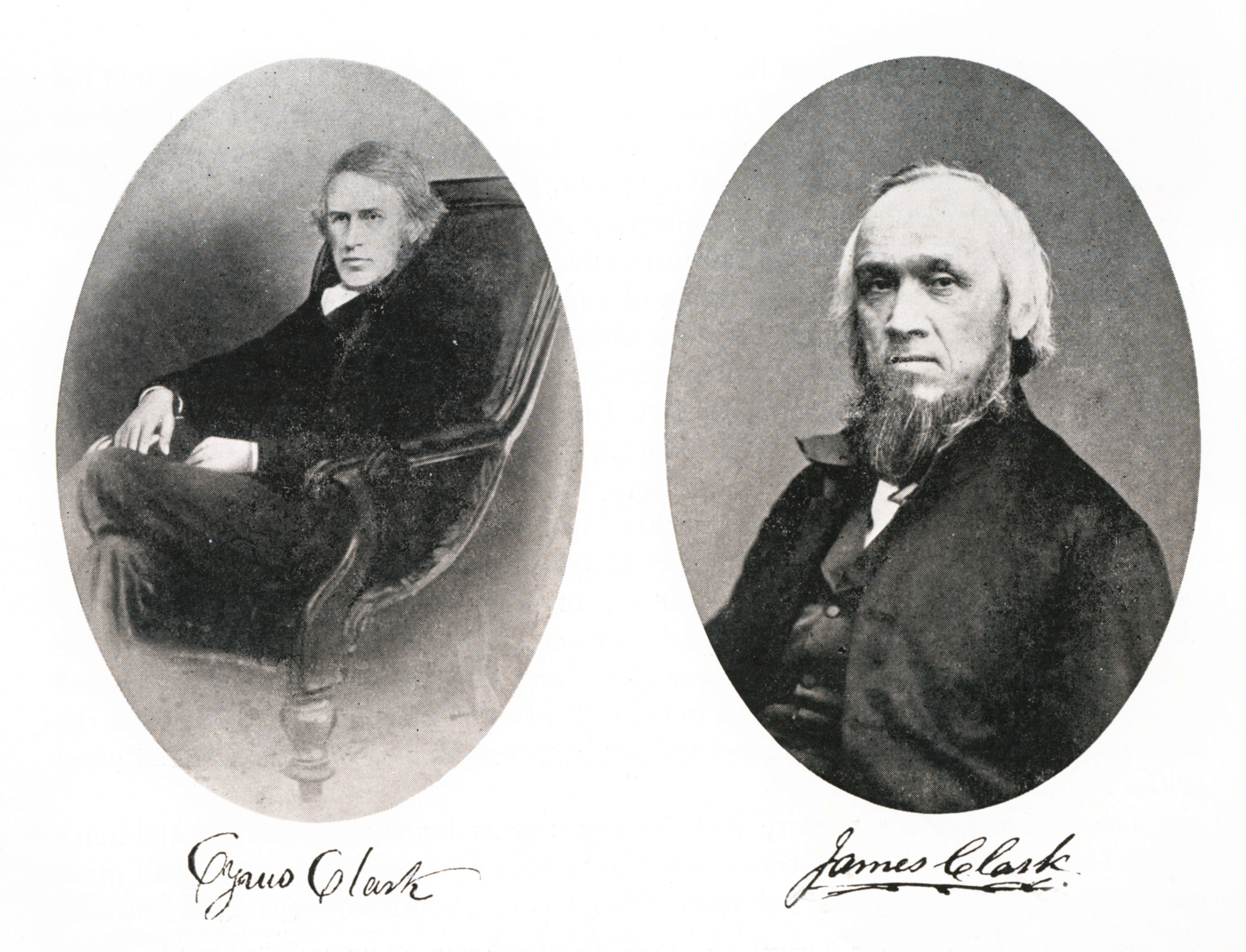
Cyrus and James Clark the founders of C&J Clark Ltd.

Origins of C. & J. Clark can be traced back to 1821 when Cyrus Clark (1801–1866) entered into a partnership with a Quaker cousin in the trade of fellmongering, wool-stapling and tanning in Street, Somerset. By 1825, this partnership had been dissolved and Cyrus relocated to a site on the High Street in Street, utilising premises that belonged to his father-in-law to exploit his idea of making rugs out of sheepskins instead of pulling off the wool. C. & J. Clark recognise this as the beginning of their business and continue to occupy the site upon which Cyrus started to this very day.

By 1828, as the business had grown, Cyrus appointed his younger brother James (1811–1906) as an apprentice. Educated away from Street, James was meant to be apprentice to a chemist in Bath, but successfully pleaded with his parents to let him stay in Street and help Cyrus. In 1828 to 1829, whilst serving this apprenticeship, James began utilising the offcuts that were too short for making rugs to produce slippers (known as Brown Petersburgs). The slippers were made using outworkers who collected materials from the factory, assembled footwear in workshops at home and returned the finished product for payment. This trade rapidly evolved, providing James with a legitimate claim to an equal partnership in the business when his apprenticeship was served in 1833. Thereafter, it traded as C. & J. Clark.

The brothers developed national and international trade (Ireland in the 1820s, Canada by the 1830s, Australia in the 1850s) and were notably innovative, winning the gold medal at the Great Exhibition in 1851 for their gutta percha elongated galosh.

=== 1863–1903 – Riding the storm ===
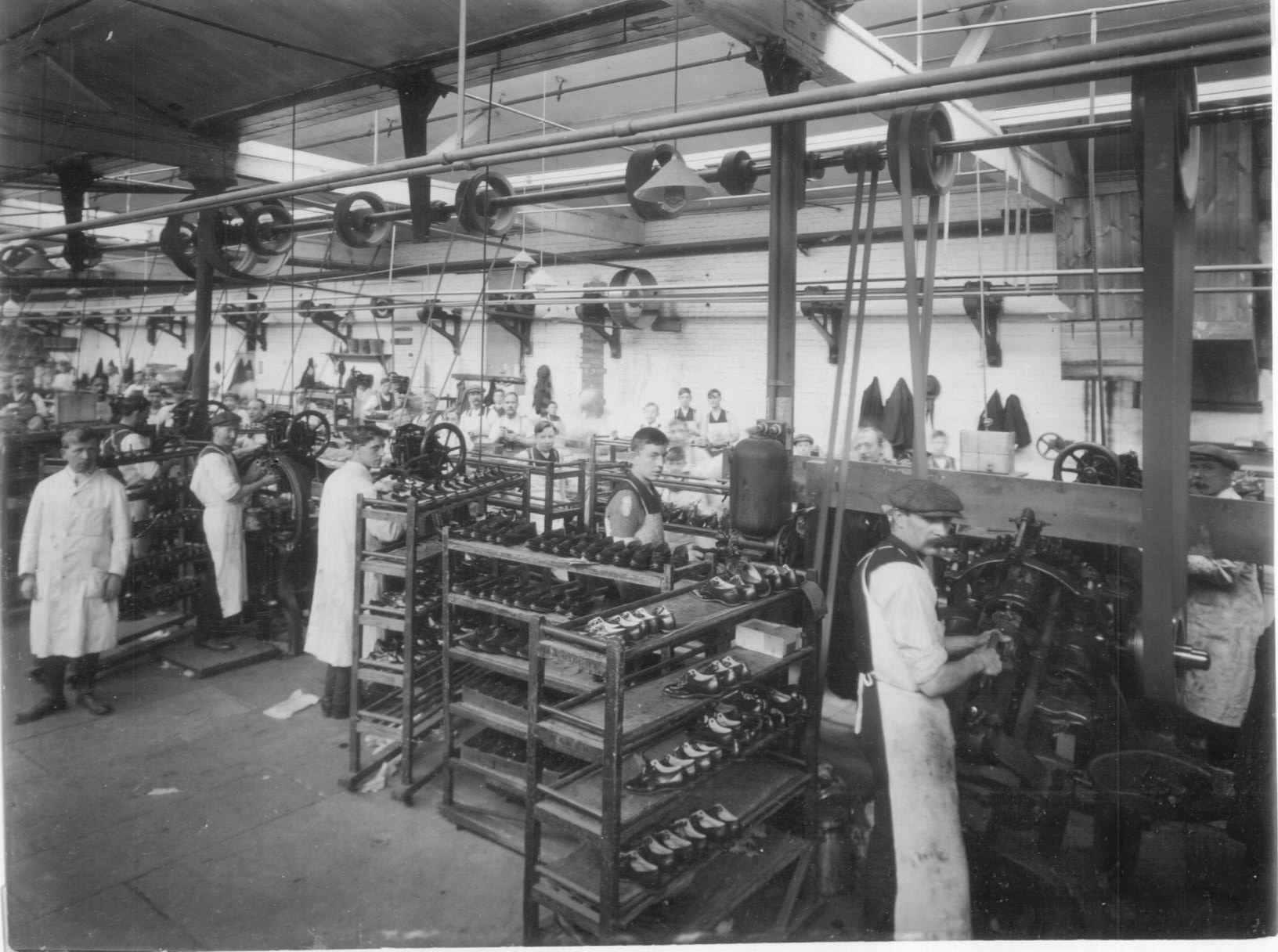
A vintage image of the sewing room in one of the Clarks factories

A couple of bad years that combined volatile market conditions, a certain lack of financial rigour and questionable planning brought the business to the brink of bankruptcy in 1863. The local Quaker community stepped in and part of the bailout deal was the nomination of James' eldest son, William Stephens Clark (1839–1925) to the helm of C. & J. Clark.

William Clark put in place an accelerated repayment plan that saw indebtedness drop considerably to 1873 when he became a partner in the business with his father James. For the first time in Britain, William mechanised the shoemaking process and went on to establish C. & J. Clark both as a pioneer of new technology and as a champion of footwear innovation. James withdrew from the partnership in 1889, to be replaced by his son Francis, William's younger brother.

In line with the family's Quaker values, the capital was also extended beyond the factory to benefit social initiatives in Street: a school was founded so that young men and women could combine working in the factory with continuing their education, a theatre was opened, a library was built, along with an open-air swimming pool and town hall. Playing fields were established for the benefit of all and low-cost housing was provided by the company for its employees.

=== 1904–1945 – Style, technology and foot measuring ===
In 1903 the partnership arrangement was discontinued in favour of a private limited company. This enabled the succession to the third generation of family members as children of William Stephens Clark became 'life directors' alongside Francis and himself. Tasked with specific responsibilities, Alice Clark, John Bright Clark and Roger Clark developed distinct roles. Brothers John Bright and Roger Clark studied American making processes and techniques with a view to appointing a suitable candidate experienced in the American factory system that they might bring to Street. John Walter Bostock from Lynn, Massachusetts was recruited in 1904. The implementation was a resounding success and Bostock was made a director of the company in 1928.

A London Office, opened in the West End in 1908, supplemented the shoemaking knowledge with style information. A reputation for high-quality goods available in the latest fashions, was established in the early 1910s, and remained until the Second World War. A premium quality 'Tor' range was produced on the principles of standard lines, followed by a range of affordable fashionable footwear called 'Wessex'. The company had its first national press advertisement in 1934 and entered formally into retailing in 1937 through the acquisition of Abbotts chain of shops based around London and the provinces. "Peter Lord" was created by Hugh Bryan Clark as a retail brand to avoid alarming agents or alerting competitors to the company's activities. It steadily evolved into a national network of stores. Growing awareness that 'bad feet' were the product of ill-fitting shoes determined Bostock to devise a new shoe fitting system based on the detailed analysis of thousands of foot measurements taken from local school children. In line with the findings the company launched its new children's ranges in 1945 with a choice of four width fittings, simultaneously with the new Clarks foot gauge that acted as a scientific measuring instrument to aid the shop assistant.

=== 1946–1995 – Growth and challenges ===
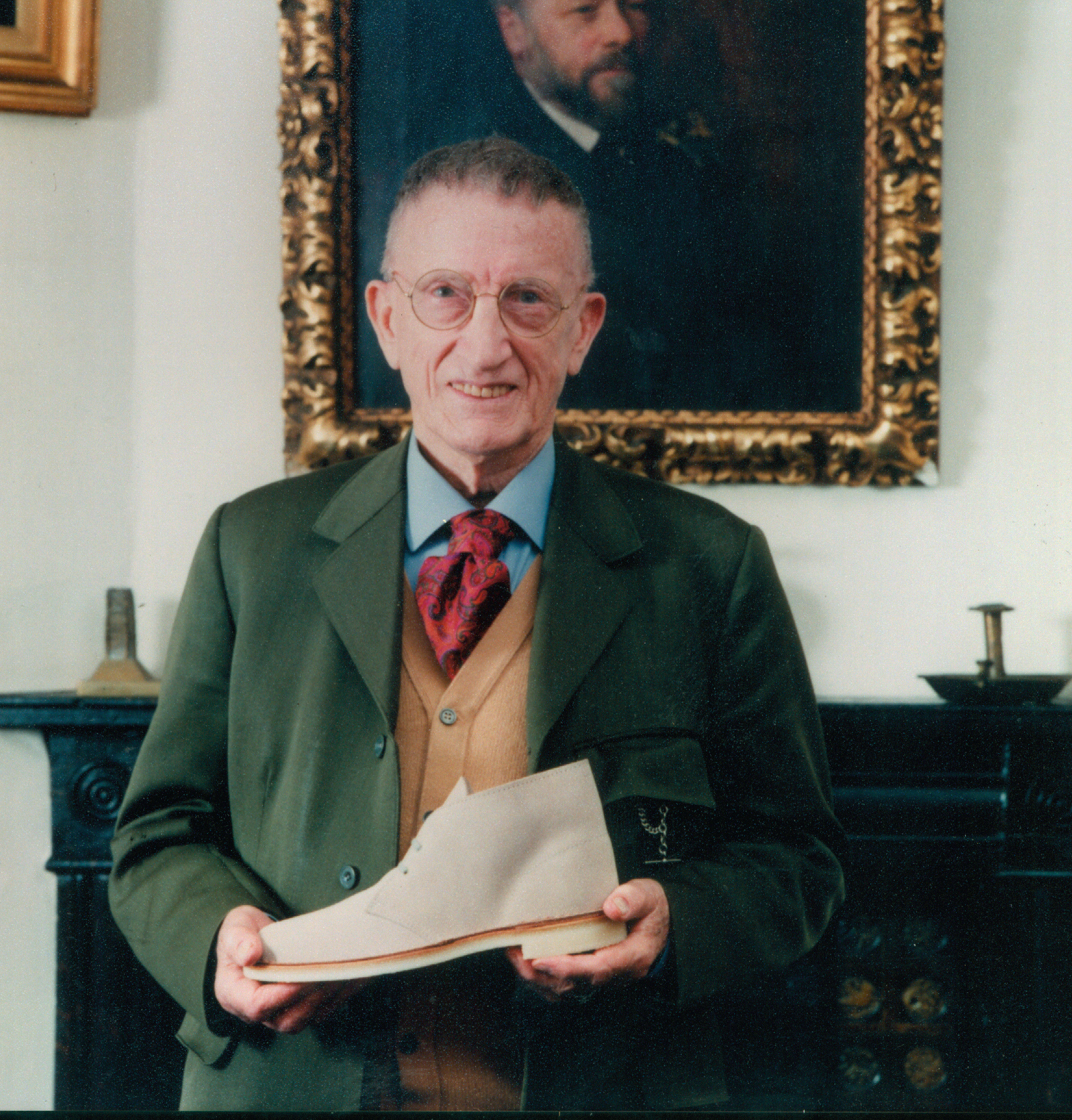
Nathan Clark holding a Desert Boot

Expansion of the business post-war was largely initiated by fourth-generation family members: Bancroft Clark, appointed managing director and chairman in 1942 and his cousins, Anthony Clark and Peter Clothier, accountable for Sales/Marketing and Manufacturing respectively.

The start-up or acquisition of additional manufacturing facilities (peaking at 17 domestic factories) across the South West and South East of England and South Wales meant that the company's volume market share in the UK increased from 1.1 per cent in 1945 to 9 per cent by 1970.

Foreign manufacturing was also sought through agreements with existing domestic manufacturers: Ireland in the 1930s with Australia, Canada and South Africa added in the 1940s and 1950s. Nathan Clark (younger brother of Bancroft) negotiated a number of these agreements in his capacity as Overseas Manager until 1952. Bancroft retired in 1967. His son, Daniel Clark succeeded Peter Clothier as managing director in 1973, with Anthony Clark remaining as chairman. He retired in 1974, when his son, Lance Clark, was appointed managing director of the manufacturing and wholesaling division. In 1974 Clarks bought the fashionable Ravel, Pinet and Mondaine. The company acquired "K" Shoes, based in Kendal, Cumbria to salvage it from a hostile takeover. The closure of factories started in 1978, and continued throughout the 1980s.

Daniel Clark resigned in 1986 replaced by John Clothier (son of Peter) who remained CEO throughout the turbulent buy-out negotiations with Berisford International Plc, a properties commodities group that attempted to take the troubled company public. While the proposal was defeated by shareholders at the EGM convened on 7 May 1993 it was also decided to move away from direct family management to professional managers, who would rationalise the business, and would be more comfortable with making the changes needed for its recovery.

=== 1996–2019: Worldwide growth and a global brand ===
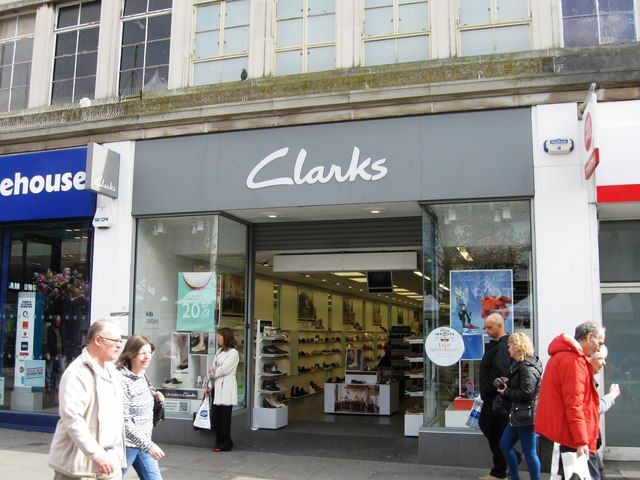
A Clarks shoe shop in Southampton, United Kingdom

The appointment of Tim Parker as CEO in 1996 was made on the initiation of the newly elected chairman, Roger Pedder. Clarks format was radically changed with the 'Act Your Shoe Size Not Your Age' Campaign in 1997, which contributed to a freshening of the brand.

Completion of the transition from manufacturing to a wholesaling and branded retailing business was conducted by Parker's successor, Peter Bolliger, who became CEO in 2002. Closure of the company's remaining manufacturing interests meant that the last Clarks UK factory ceased production in 2005 followed by the last "K" factory in 2006. Production was relocated off-shore, using third party factories, predominantly located in Asia.

Transformation of retail and investment to modernise company infrastructure and systems was also completed. Street consequently remains the epicentre for company operations, a distribution facility having been constructed in the village in 2005 with the capacity to process 1 million pairs of shoes per week.

Former CEO, Melissa Potter, who was appointed in 2010, re-organized the business in four regions Americas, Asia Pacific, Europe and United Kingdom & Republic of Ireland (from February 2013), the re-launch in China, the move into India, the launch of the online business and the increased focus on building a global brand. Melissa Potter stepped down as CEO in September 2015. Non-executive chairman Thomas O’Neill lead the business until 2017 when Mike Shearwood was appointed as the new CEO. Then following Shearwood's resignation in June 2018, Stella David was announced as interim CEO. In February 2019, Giorgio Presca was announced as the new CEO, and David returned to her role on the board.

In May 2018, the company announced that it would build a new production plant next to its headquarters in Street, Somerset. The £3 million factory would see the latest in robot technology and create 80 jobs and produce over 300,000 pairs of Desert Shoes per year.

=== 2020–present: Private equity takeover and industrial action ===
In November 2020, Clarks announced a rescue plan through a £100 million investment by the Hong Kong–based private equity firm LionRock Capital after a company voluntary arrangement (CVA), a form of insolvency, in which the Clarks family will lose overall control of the company. The CVA requires the agreement of landlords, who would receive a percentage of turnover as rent, and creditors. In January 2021, Viva China Holdings has agreed to acquire 51 per cent of LionRock Capital Partners QiLe Limited, the private equity firm which will own the Clarks brand, for £51 million. The majority owner of Viva China Holdings is entrepreneur Li Ning, a former Olympic gold medal winner for China. This resulted in Victor Herrero, a Spanish executive and former CEO of Guess, being named as the new Clarks CEO in March 2021. Prior to his appointment as CEO, he served as a board member to Clarks since April 2019. Hierro then oversaw cost-cutting measures, including offering staff a choice of lower wages or redundancy, which the Financial Times said "provoked resentment among many life-long employees and fury from unions", with "[m]any staff with long service at the company [...] moved on to minimum wage contracts". In late 2021 staff at their Street warehouse went on strike over firing and rehiring. Jonathan Ram was named CEO in March 2022 and took the position in April of that year.

Between 2022–2023, Clarks launched a collaboration with English footballer Raheem Sterling. Through the collaboration, Sterling launched his own range of Clarks Wallabies as Raheem Sterling x Clarks Originals. The line in the Raheem Sterling x Clarks Originals is said to include a nod to Sterling's roots in Jamaica, with an Est 1692 badge included on the design, said to be an acknowledgement of Kingston, the capital of Jamaica, which was founded in 1692. Sterling featured in the companies Back to School campaign in 2023 to launch the "Goal" shoe, a school shoe aimed primarily at primary school children, in an attempt to "capture the attention, consideration, and affection of Millennial parents". The advertisement campaign was said to "create scenarios based on familiar primary school situations with authentic interactions between real schoolchildren and teachers". The Raheem Sterling range of school shoes feature a football on the bottom soles, with each shoe featuring half a football which, when both shoes are placed together, form a full football on the bottom. The company claim that the "football inspired playprints sole design lets kids leave their own unique impression on the world". The interior of the school shoes in the range feature a green insole, with a football themed lining.

In January 2024, Clarks' operations in the Netherlands went bankrupt as part of a restructuring takeover plan, where Alain Broekaert Group (GAB) will maintain ownership of the company.

== Clarks Companies North America (CCNA) ==
The history of C&J Clark's representation in America dates back to 1950 and the formation of Clarks of England Inc. Initiated by Bronson Davis, a car salesman, who had seen the Desert Boot at the Chicago Shoe Fair in 1949. Davis established a sales organization covering 150 accounts with outlets that stocked Clarks products, predominantly Desert Boots. He also sponsored advertisements for Clarks shoes in The New Yorker and Esquire magazines. Davis established relations with some of America's most prestigious retailers; Abercrombie & Fitch, Neiman-Marcus and Saks Fifth Avenue. The coverage for the Desert Boot was consolidated by advertising that targeted the 'campus trade' of Berkeley, Cornell, Harvard, North Carolina and Yale Universities through ads in Esquire and college magazines. A young salesman named Robert (Bob) Cullerton followed Bronson Davis at the lead in America. Appointed President in April 1961, he inherited a business focussed on the provision of men's casuals and the Desert Boot. He appointed designer Nancy Knox to create a new range advertised via Playboy and Gentlemen's Quarterly.

In parallel with American developments, C&J Clark Ltd. acquired the Blachford Shoe Manufacturing Co. Ltd. of Toronto in 1952, establishing a foothold in Canada led by Hugh Woods and Harold Hughes. Similarities between the businesses in Canada and North America meant Cullerton, Woods and Hughes quickly collaborated. They developed a clear vision of what women's sandals and shoes were required to supplement the demand for men's casual offerings. An Italian resourcing programme was started by Woods in 1960 to get more style and variety into the ranges. Offices were opened in the Empire State Building, New York in April 1964. Sales were also buoyed by the introduction of the Wallabee in the late 1960s and expansion towards the West Coast. Wholesaling interests were complemented with retail from the late 1970s through the acquisition of Hanover Shoes Inc. who owned 220 retail shops. At the same time C&J Clark decided to bring together its North American interests under one corporation to operate Hanover, Clarks of England and Clarks Canada. The business grew further in 1979 through the acquisition of Bostonian, a well-respected men's dress shoe brand, adding 25 more shop locations as well as entry into 70 leased stores and discounting outlets. Responsibility for Clarks Canada and Clarks of England was transferred to the C&J Clarks HQ in Street in 1986. Clarks of England and Clarks Canada officially merged in 1987 to provide more operational efficiencies and more consistency of product offering for North America.

Bob Infantino became CEO of the North American operations in 1992, taking a key role in consolidating the manufacturing, retailing, and wholesaling activities in America into one company: Clarks Companies North America (CCNA) from 1995. By 1998, CCNA became principally a wholesaling business, serving 170 owned retail locations and 3,600 third party wholesale accounts, representing 14,200 retail outlets. Sales increased by 57 per cent from 1995 to 2001, profits rose five-fold. Infantino left the company in 2010, replaced by Jim Salzano who was at the helm of the North American business until 2013, when CCNA officially became the Americas Region, one of the four regions resulting as part of the re-organization initiated by Melissa Potter. Since March 2016 Gary Champion has led the Americas Region as president, also serving on the Global Leadership Team.

== Clarks Kids ==
=== School shoes ===
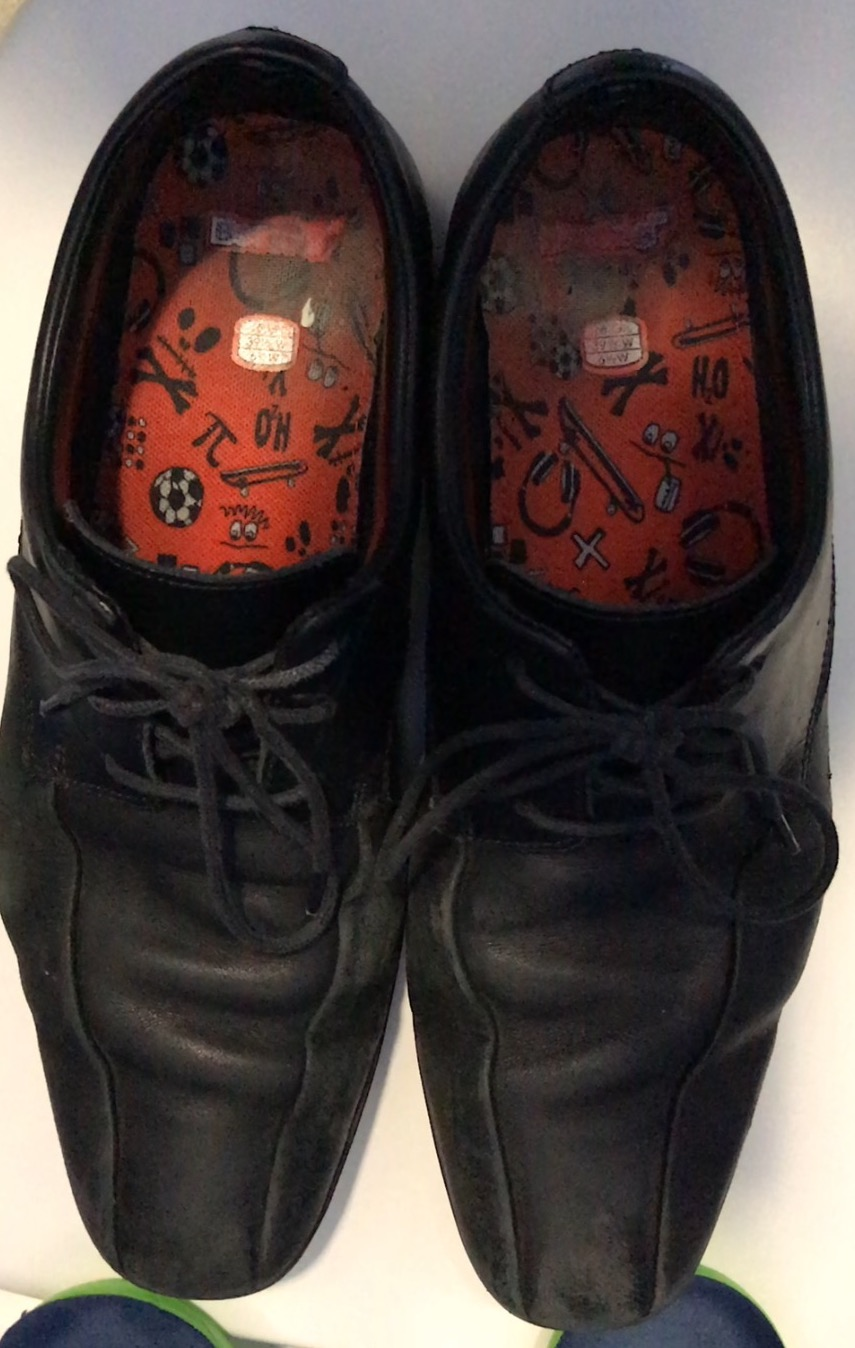
An example of school shoes for boys from Clarks' Bootleg range.

In the United Kingdom, Clarks has long been a popular choice of parents as a place to purchase school shoes for children to wear upon returning to school following the summer holidays. The UK newspaper The Independent ranked Clarks as the number one provider of school shoes in the United Kingdom in 2017, highlighting that it has been providing quality shoes for over 170 years and highlighting the fact that Clarks is one of only a few manufacturers of school shoes to be provided in half sizes. Parents have opted for them as most of Clarks school shoes meet the standards set by most primary and secondary school uniform policies, while at the same time being long-lasting and durable.

From the mid-2010s, Clarks' more relaxed shoe designs and stricter school uniform policies has resulted in some schools judging that some models of Clarks school shoes do not comply with its school uniform policy. Some models, including those from the Daisy range which came with miniature toys stored inside a compartment hidden within the heel area, garnered criticism from both parents and school boards due to both peer pressure concerns and safety issues. In 2007, a primary school in Bolton banned the toys on safety grounds due to an incident involving a seven-year old student who ingested one of the toys that came with her shoes.

In 2016, nationwide attention was gathered after 12-year-old Alfie Ingerfeild from Bristol was sent home from school at the beginning of the new school term in September after wearing a pair of Harlem Spin shoes from Clarks' Bootleg school shoe range. The school, Mangotsfield School, claimed that the Harlem Spin design was "too much like trainers" and therefore classed them as unacceptable and not complying with the school uniform policy, so much so to the extent that the Deputy Head Teacher of Mangotsfield School said that should the shoes be worn the following school day then the pupil would be asked to remove them and forced to wear shoes from lost property. This is despite the fact that the Harlem Spin shoes were advertised by Clarks as being school shoes—Clarks did not give a statement in regards to the incident and questions over the design of the Harlem Spin shoes.

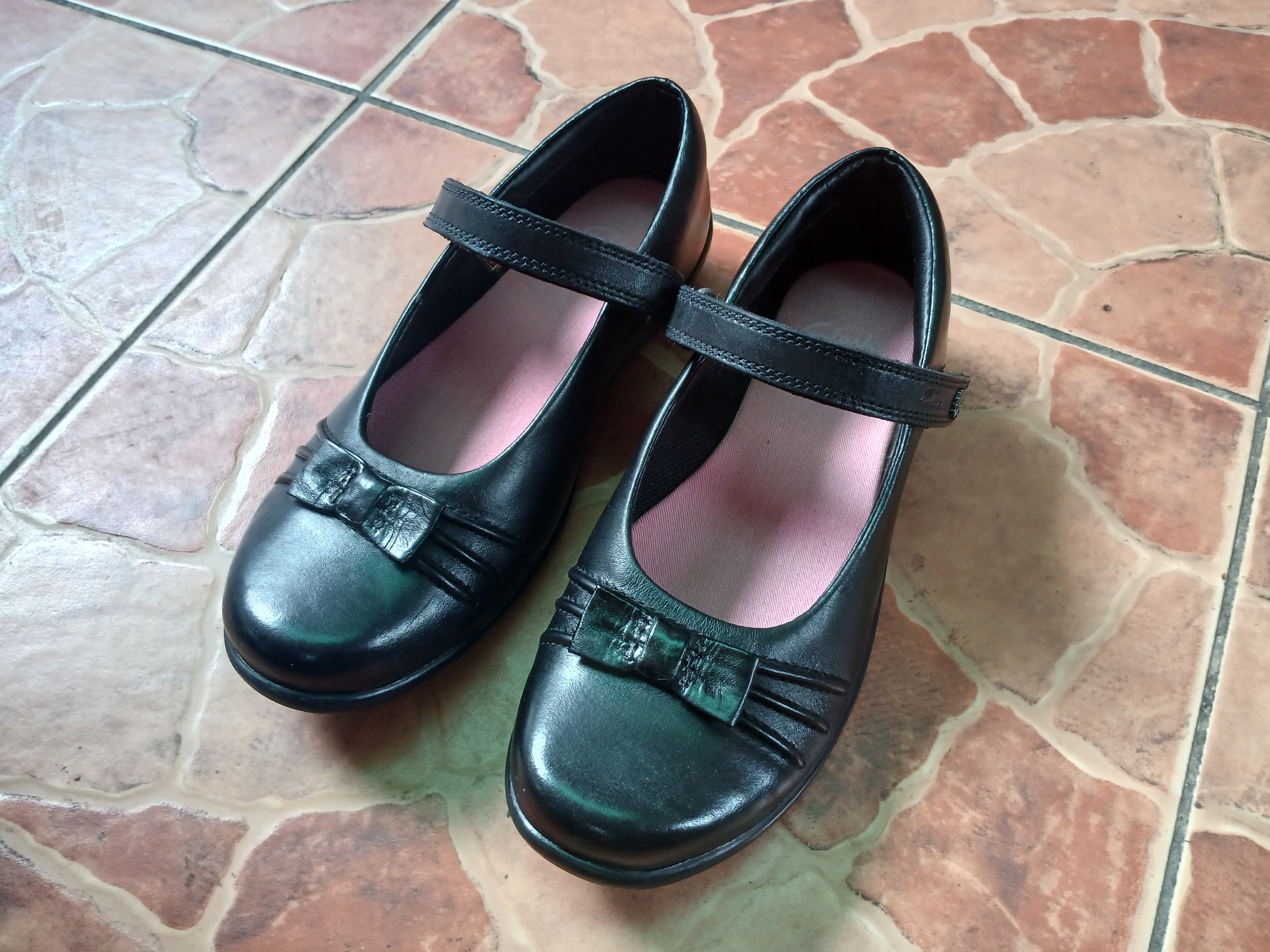
A pair of Mary Jane school shoes from Clarks' "Daisy" range for girls.

In 2017, a particular style of Mary Jane shoes called "Dolly Babe" was compared unfavourably to Clarks' own "Leader" school shoe for boys, with parents and ministers both accusing the company of sexism and gender stereotypes —the Mary Janes in question being viewed as flimsy and stereotypically feminine with a heart-print insole and a heart-shaped charm on the toe box while the boys' shoe was seen as sturdier. The company soon apologised over the matter and withdrew the shoe from sale. Clarks also issued a statement saying it would commit to designing "gender-neutral" footwear following customer feedback.

In March 2018, two pupils from Kearsley Academy were sent home from school due to their school shoes, both purchased from Clarks, for "looking too much like trainers". The shoes in question were both purchased from Clarks' Bootleg range, a designated brand of school shoes from Clarks marketed for older children and teenagers.

From 2023, Clarks began producing school shoes in collaboration with footballer Raheem Sterling, with school shoes in the Raheem Sterling range featuring a bright green insole with football lined padding, as well as featuring half of a football on each sole, representing a football when both shoes are placed together.

=== Joyance sandal ===
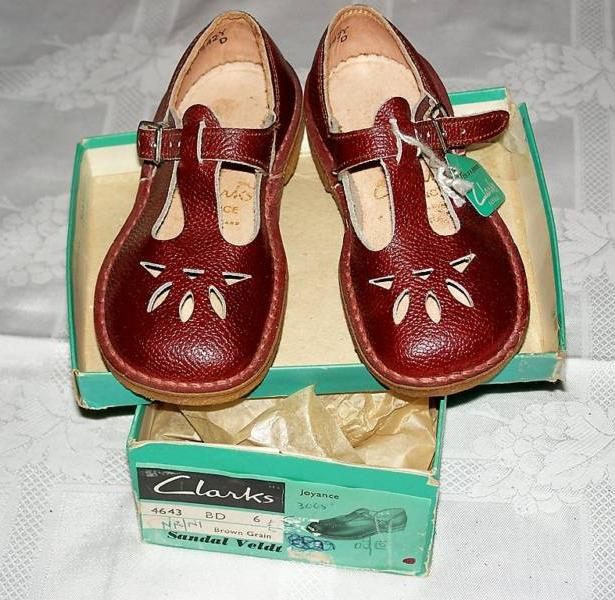
Clarks Joyance T-bar sandals were produced from 1933 to 1973.

During the 20th century, Clarks established a reputation for quality children's footwear. The crepe rubber soled Joyance T-bar sandal for both boys and girls was one of their most popular designs. Launched in 1933, it continued in production until 1972. In 1952, Clarks claimed to be selling more than one million pairs of children's sandals in sixty countries.

== Clarks Originals ==
=== Desert Boot ===
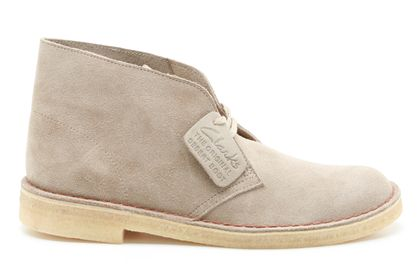
The Clarks Desert Boot

The company's best-known product is the Desert Boot—a distinctive ankle height boot with crepe sole usually made out of calf suede leather supplied by Charles F Stead & Co tannery in Leeds. Officially launched in 1950 the Desert Boot was designed by Nathan Clark (great-grandson of James Clark).

Nathan Clark was an officer in the Royal Army Service Corps posted to Burma in 1941 with orders to help establish a supply route from Rangoon to the Chinese forces at Chongqing whilst also launching a series of offensives throughout South East Asia. Before leaving home his brother Bancroft had given him the mission to gather any information on footwear that might be of use to the company whilst he was travelling the world. The Desert Boot was the result of this mission.

His discovery of the Desert Boot was made either at Staff College in 1944 or on leave in Kashmir where three divisions of the old Eighth Army (transferred to the Far East from North Africa) were wearing ankle-high suede boots manufactured in the bazaars of Cairo. Nathan sent sketches and rough patterns back to Bancroft, but no trials were made until after he returned to Street and cut the patterns himself.

The Desert Boot was cut on the men's Guernsey Sandal last and sampled in a neutral beige-grey 2 mm chrome bend split suede. The company's Stock Committee reacted badly to the sample and dismissed the idea as it 'would never sell'. It was only in his capacity as Overseas Development Manager that Nathan had any success with the shoe after introducing it to Oskar Schoefler (Fashion Editor, Esquire Magazine) at the Chicago Shoe Fair in 1949. He gave them substantial editorial credits with colour photographs in Esquire in early 1950. Bronson Davies subsequently saw these articles and applied to represent the company in selling them across the US, long before they were available in the UK. The Desert Boot was initially sold in Britain through shops in Regent Street, featuring a Union Jack sewn into the label, targeted at tourists. Lance Clark is widely credited with popularising them in Europe during the 1960s.

The Desert Boot have been manufactured at Shepton Mallet, small scale production having initially occurred at Street. During the course of time, Whitecross factory in Weston-super-Mare was subcontracted to relieve Shepton factory of the manufacture of the Desert Boot, before the Bushacre factory at Locking Road, Weston-Super-Mare was constructed in 1958. The Desert Boot was manufactured there until the closure of the factory in 2001.

Clarks announced in July 2017, it was restarting manufacturing Desert Boots, using a new manufacturing unit featuring "robot-assisted" technology, at its headquarters in Street, Somerset. Up to 300,000 pairs a year of desert boots were to be made at the unit, creating up to eighty technical and managerial jobs. However, in January 2019 the company announced that this unit was to be closed, after failing to meet production targets.

=== Wallabee ===
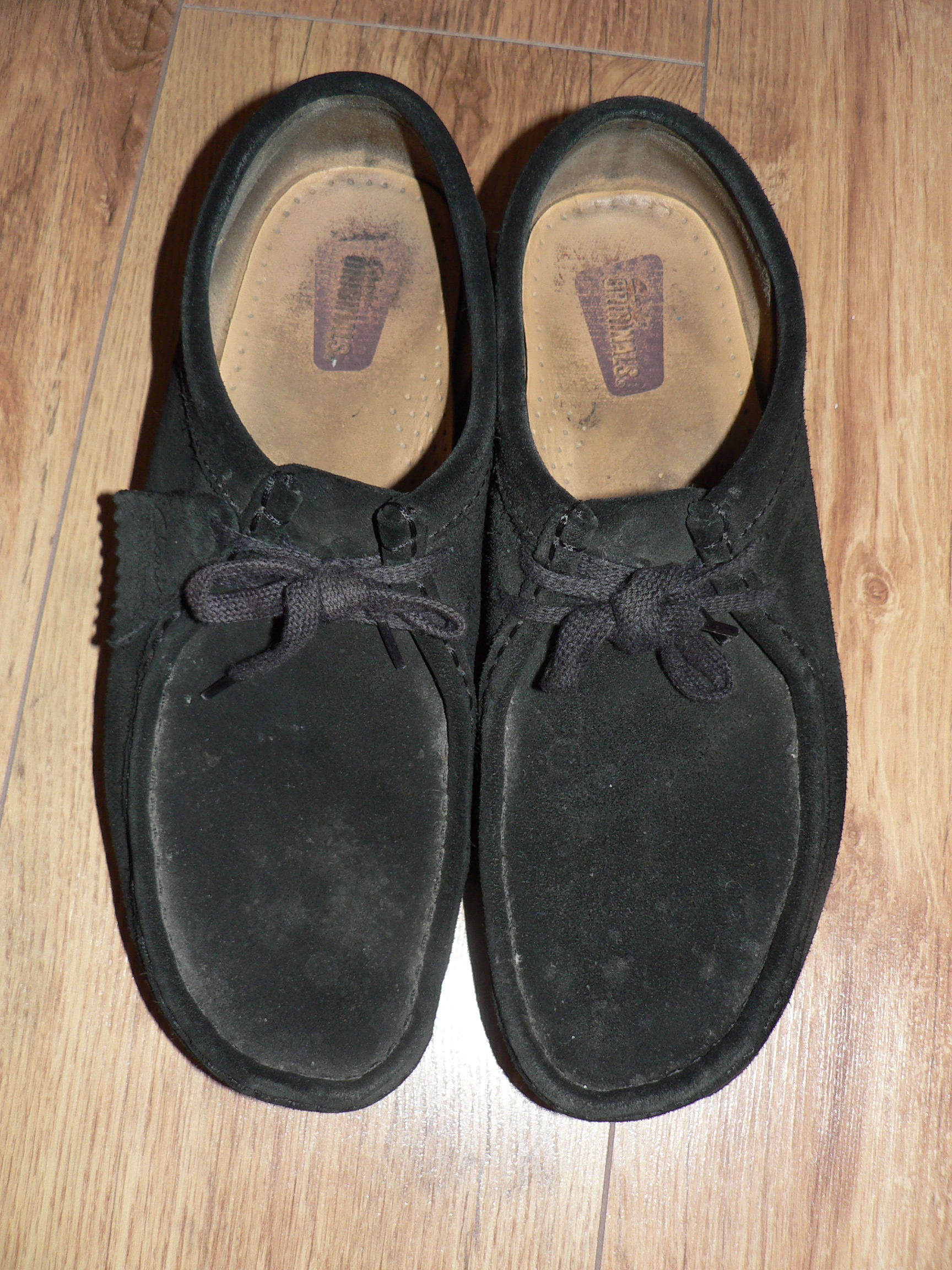
A pair of Clarks Wallabies. This particular pair was used as school shoes.

Produced by Clarks from 1967 and based on a moccasin called the Grasshopper, launched in 1964 by the German company Sioux, the Wallabee brand was manufactured at the Padmore and Barnes factory based in Kilkenny, Ireland, which Clarks had acquired in 1963 and continued to operate until its closure in 1987, when it was the subject of a management buy-out. Managed by Lance Clark who was responsible for having negotiated the licence to produce the shoes in Kilkenny and arranged for the factory staff to be trained in the production of moccasin shoes, the product took off once the decision was taken to market it in North America in 1968. As General Manager of the factory, Paddy Roberts took the shoe to a trade fair in New York in the same year, whereupon he quickly learnt that the trademark Grasshopper had been licensed. In conjunction with Jack Rose-Smith (Clarks Overseas Shoes Export Manager), Bob Cullerton (the President for Clarks in America/Clarks of England), Hugh Woods (managing director of Clarks Canada), Roberts trademarked the name Wallabee. In New Zealand, they were marketed as Nomads.

=== Desert Trek ===
Another style associated with the Lance Clark who had seen a Zwartjes version of the shoe on the feet of artist Sonja Landweer in the late 1960s. An artist in residence at the Kilkenny Design Workshops, where she had come into contact with Lance Clark, Landweer's shoes became the basis for production of the Trek which was first attempted at Clarks factory in Dundalk. This was more attuned to the construction of stitch-down footwear. The shoe was initially launched in North America in 1971 as Trek, before featuring in the UK range in 1972 where it was renamed Hike, owing to an existing footwear trademark. The 'Trek man' that first featured on the shoe was drafted by Lance Clark and refined by the advertising manager in Dundalk, Bob Patten.

== Popular culture ==
Some Clarks styles (particularly the Desert Boot, Wallabee & Desert Trek) were widely adopted as cultural icons by different subcultures and featured in songs as well as popular films and TV series. The most referenced is the popularity of the Clarks shoes in Jamaica and the association with the Jamaican "rude boys" movement.

According to DJ, producer and cultural historian Al Fingers in his book, Clarks in Jamaica, this trend started in the late 1960s when the emerging youth culture of the recently independent Jamaica adopted the Clarks shoes as part of their "uniform." "The original gangster rude boy dem, a Clarks dem wear," producer Jah Thomas tells Fingers in the book. "And in Jamaica a rude boy him nah wear cheap ting." Writes Fingers, "In the early 70s, the rude boy/desert boot association became so strong that young males risked a beating by police simply for wearing a pair. 'You must be a thief,' the police would say. 'How else would you afford such expensive Clarks?'" He tells the story of an infamous Kingston police officer called Joe Williams, who carried out a raid on a dance being run by producer and label boss "Sir Coxsone" Dodd. The DJ Dennis Alcapone recalls the arrival of Superintendent Williams: "He tell the DJ to turn the sound down, and he say: 'All who's wearing Clarks booty, stand on that side of the dance. And who's not wearing Clarks booty stand on this side.' Because he knows that rude boys wear them, so that is a way of identifying them." Reggae and dancehall stars Dillinger, Trinity, Ranking Joe, Scorcher, Little John, Super Cat and countless others had sung about Clarks in the past. Some of the most famous songs written about the Clarks shoes in Jamaica are Little John's "Clarks Booty" and Vybz Kartel's "Clarks" (over 2.6 million hits on YouTube).

While the Clarks Desert Boots became fashionable in the Beatnik Culture in the US, they became popular with youth in the UK after being adopted by Sixties Mods who wore them as part of both smart and casual clothing outfits. While the shoes are appropriate for a unisex look, they were particularly popular with male mods who wore them with military parkas, tailor-made suits with narrow lapels (sometimes made of mohair), thin ties, button-down collar shirts, and wool or cashmere jumpers.

The joint influences of the Beatniks and Mods made the Clarks Desert Boots ("Les Clarks") popular among the Parisian students who wore them during the 1968 riots.

The Clarks Desert Boots carried on through to the Mod Revival era of the Seventies and Eighties becoming a true Retro Mod Classic. They famously featured quite heavily in the 1979 "Quadrophenia", Franc Roddam's film adaptation of the Who's rock opera influencing in turn the Britpop movement of the 1990s.

The Clarks Wallabees in particular were adopted in recent times by the American rapper community. Their appeal can be traced to a wave of Jamaican immigrants who came to New York in the 1970s and paired Clarks shoes with suits. "African-Americans saw it as an alternative to sneakers and jeans and incorporated it into their look," said Slick Rick, a rapper, whose parents were born in Jamaica and later moved to the Bronx. "It's a way to be casual but not look like a scrub. The ladies like that."

The shoe was long a staple of fashionable West Indians in New York City but towards the 1990s had fallen out of favor in hip-hop circles who tended to gravitate toward Timberland boots or sneakers. The rebirth of the Clarks Wallabees as a cool staple from mid-late 1990s is linked with New York–based hip-hop group the Wu-Tang Clan. Wu members (RZA, GZA, Method Man, Raekwon, Ghostface Killah, Inspectah Deck, U-God, Masta Killa, and the late Ol' Dirty Bastard) and in particular Raekwon and Ghostface Killah wore Wallabees because not only they found them aesthetically pleasing but also since no other rapper was wearing them, they showed that they weren't victims of the trends. They even featured the name of the shoe in the lyrics of several songs, engendering a revival of the Wallabees as a hip-hop staple by the mid-late 1990s. This justified Ghostface Killah to call himself Wally Champ and feature custom-dyed Wallabee shoes on the cover of his 1996 "Ironman" album. His 2008 compilation album was also called "The Wallabee Champ".

In the TV series, Breaking Bad, lead character Walter White (played by Bryan Cranston) transforms from a high school chemistry teacher into a powerful drug kingpin with pork pie hat, black sunglasses and goatee, but he still wears Wallabees, the only shoe he wears from the beginning of the five-season series until its completion.

== Heritage ==
The business archive and collections associated with Clarks are held by the Alfred Gillett Trust, and are on public display at the Shoemakers Museum which opened in September 2025

The Shoemakers Museum replaced an earlier museum, The Shoe Museum which was established in 1950 by Laurence Barber in the Clarks' headquarters in Street, Somerset. The museum displayed some 1,500 shoes as well as related exhibits, describing the development of shoes from Roman times and especially detailing the growth of Clarks shoes and shoemaking in Somerset. In 2002, a charity called the Alfred Gillett Trust was established to care for the archives and collections of C. & J. Clark and the Clark family. The trust's collections include family and business archives, catalogues and sale materials, artwork and furniture, costume, film and sound archives, historic shoes and shoe making machinery. The trust is named after Alfred Gillett, a cousin of the company's founders and an amateur paleontologist; some of his fossils are included in the trust's collection. The trust is based at The Grange, a Grade II listed building in Street. In September 2019, The Shoe Museum closed and the collection transferred to the Alfred Gillett Trust's archive. The collection was finally purchased by the Alfred Gillett Trust in 2021, who created and opened a new public museum Shoemakers Museum at The Grange in 2025. Shoemakers Museum opened to the public on 18 September 2025

== Stores ==
Clarks stores in the UK offer a core selection of best selling shoes for men, women and children, larger stores offer a wider selection of products than 'Global' stores. Clarks stores are recognised for their staff who are trained in foot measuring and shoe fitting, which many other retaillers do not provide. The flagship Clarks store is Oxford Circus, London, opened in November 2025.

=== Clarks Outlet ===
Formerly 'Clarks Factory Shopping', Outlet stores feature out-of-season, factory second or discontinued products alongside a limited selection of best sellers from a high street store. The flagship Outlet store is next to Clarks' headquarters, at the Clarks Village outlet shopping centre in Street, Somerset.

=== Clarks Originals ===
Clarks Originals stores stock only Originals-branded products, notably the Desert Boot, Wallabee and Desert Trek. The company previously had a store in its headquarters in Street, alongside two stores in Soho, London and Manchester. As of 2026, all Originals stores in the UK are permanently closed, but some still operate in China.

=== Cloudsteppers ===
In 2025, Clarks opened a new line of stores selling the Cloudsteppers line of products. Positioned as a lifestyle brand, Clarks Cloudsteppers produces shoes with a soft sole, advertised as 'cloud-like comfort'. The Solevana range of shoes - the brand's best selling trainer of 2025 - are a key seller in the stores, alongside colourful summer sandals and the brand's first foray into clothing (including t-shirts, hoodies, caps and socks). Cloudsteppers stores are now open in the US, Malaysia and India.

== See also ==
- Helen Bright Clark, wife of William Stephens Clark, women's rights activist and suffragist
- Alice Clark, daughter of William Stephens Clark, feminist and historian.
- Dr Hilda Clark, daughter of William Stephens Clark, physician and humanitarian
- John Clark, cousin of Cyrus and James Clark, inventor of the Latin Verse Machine.
- Shoemakers Museum, a new museum in Street, Somerset.
