= Hilda Clark (doctor) =

British physician and humanitarian aid worker

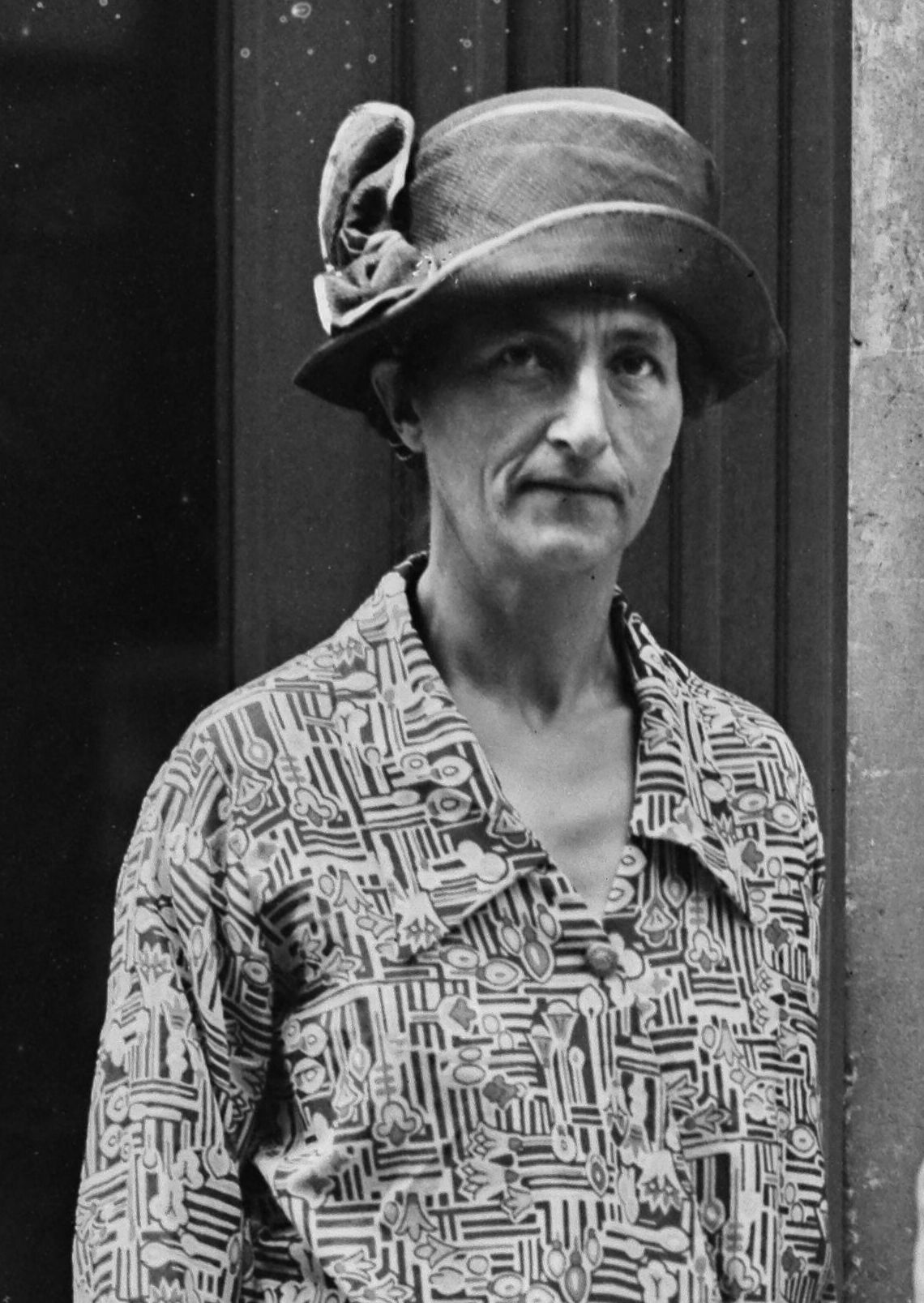
Hilda Clark in 1925

Hilda Clark (12 January 1881 – 24 February 1955) was a British physician and humanitarian aid worker.

== Early life ==
Clark was born 12 January 1881 at Green Bank, Street, Somerset and was the youngest child of the Quaker shoe manufacturer William Stephens Clark and the social reformer Helen Priestman Bright Clark.

As a child, she was involved in athletics and gymnastics. She had a Quaker education at Brighthelmston, at Birkdale in Southport, Lancashire, about 1896–7, and The Mount, in York, from about 1897 to 1900, before studying medicine at Birmingham University and the Royal Free Hospital, London where she graduated M.B. and B.S. in 1908. She was the sister of Alice Clark, the feminist and historian and the niece of Annie Clark, one the first women to formally train in medicine in Britain. Her mother and great-aunts helped to found a number of women's rights organizations in the 1860s. Her paternal grandmother was also involved in anti-slavery organizations and as a whole, humanitarian work and aiding others had surrounded her life from a very young age. Throughout her life, Clark had been surrounded by a family and environment who strongly valued education, social justice, and service to the public, which influenced her activist and medical work later on in her life.

== Medicine ==
Hilda Clark studied medicine at the London School of Medicine for Women. This was one of the first to allow women the field and later Clark worked and started hospitals, and public health. She worked in specialized fields in which she was able to focus on women and children, proper sanitization and bacteralization, etc. Clark specialized in the treatment of pulmonary tuberculosis. She opened and ran two tuberculin dispensaries, the first at her home town of Street in Somerset, the second, by appointment as Medical Officer of the Portsmouth Municipal Tuberculin Dispensary in 1911.

In 1910 she successfully treated her sister, Alice Clark, a suffragist who was suffering from tuberculosis. Clark gave a paper on "Tuberculosis Statistics: Some Difficulties in the Presentation of Facts bearing on the Tuberculosis Problem in a Suitable Form for Statistical Purposes", later published in Proceedings of the Royal Society of Medicine, 1914. In this paper, she highlights the proper treatment and advancements in tuberculosis diagnosis and treatment and how and where this disease populates.

== World War I ==
Together with her life-long friend and business partner Edith Pye, a nurse and midwife, Clark founded and ran a maternity hospital at Chalons-sur-Marne from 1914 to 1918. During this time, Clark and Pye helped a multitude of women during the war providing care, resources, medical aide, and even just a place to stay. She acted as an activist and helping hand to those women feeling invisible and looked over who struggled to find the proper care during this time.

== 1923-1937: humanitarian activism ==
During the 1920s, Clark was an active member of several organisations, including the League of Nations, the Women's Peace Crusade (of which she was secretary), the Women's International League for Peace and Freedom, the International Commission for the Assistance of Child Refugees as well as Quaker campaigns such as the Friends' Service Council. She was also an early supporter of the British Society for the Study of Sex Psychology, an organisation concerned with societal acceptance of homosexuality. She also had involvement in forming the War Victims Relief Committee in corresopondence with her friend Edith Pye.

== 1938 Anschluss ==
Austria was annexed by Germany in the Anschluss of 12 March 1938. Clark travelled to Vienna to use her expertise and connections in generating documentation, placements and qualifications for Jewish people to aid their escape. The behind the scenes efforts made by Hilda Clark were vital to the successes and growth of the profession had during this time. Her work was such a powerful impact on what had happened in a positive way and many people that were not active participants in the efforts had in annexation of Vienna were truly aware of what Clark had given.

== Later life and death ==
Her home in London was bombed in 1940 , after which she moved to Kent, where she was active in the Soldiers, Sailors and Airmens Families Association. Later in life, Clark became disabled as a result of Parkinson's disease and returned to Street in 1952, where she died at her home on 24 February 1955 and was buried at the Street Quaker burial ground. The work done by Clark, especially during times of barriers for women in medical and activist work made ways for women to pursue a career in these fields and helped ignite passions for women to feel empowered and validated to go and further their careers in medicine.

The Hilda Clark room at Friends House, London, UK is named after her.

== Publications ==
- The Dispensary Treatment of Pulmonary Tuberculosis. London, Bailliere & Co. 1915
- Pye, Edith Mary (ed) War and its Aftermath. Letters from Hilda Clark from France, Austria and the Near East 1914-1924. London, Friends Book House, 1956
- The Armaments Industry: a study of the report of the Royal Commission on the Manufacture of and Trade in Arms and Munitions of War and of the Evidence published in the Minutes of the Commission during 1936. London, Women’s Peace Crusade 1937

== Archives ==
Hilda Clark Papers. 1908-1950.Temp MSS 301. The Library of the Society of Friends, London.
