= Jane Elizabeth Strickland =

Jane Elizabeth Strickland JP (1851–1932) née Slade was an English suffragist, pacifist and magistrate.

== Early life and background ==
She was born in Leeds in 1851, the daughter of William Slade and his Mary Ann Appleby, daughter of Samuel Appleby of New Wortley, a mill owner. Her brother Robert Eustace Slade (died 1927) was one of the founders of Slade & Bullock of Dewsbury, the firm which is credited with perfecting seaside rock. Another brother, Ernest Felix Slade (1869–1940), died as chairman of St Ivel.

=== William and Mary Ann Slade ===
William Slade, jun. of Providence Road, Leeds, was a good friend of Thomas Scales and a deacon in his Queen's Road Chapel. They both belonged to the Leeds sub-division of the Evangelical Alliance.

Slade was the son of William Slade, sen., a corn factor in Leeds at 13 Warehouse Hill, living in Cobourg Street, and was educated at Leeds Grammar School. He was a bookseller and printer, who published Scales's funeral sermon preached for John Ely (1793–1847) of the East Parade chapel, at 7 Bond Street, Leeds. He also ran the Leeds Repository for the Religious Tract Society.

The family moved to Hastings in 1863. William Slade bought the music warehouse in the town run by William Henry Acraman. From 1867, Slade was a deacon of the Robertson Street Congregational Church there. He supported the British & Foreign Bible Society.

William Slade was a Liberal in politics, and an advocate of nonviolent resistance. He was buried in Hastings in 1903, aged 81. His wife Mary Ann died at Walcot Lodge, Hastings in 1926, aged 102. After her husband's death, she had founded the Slade Club in Brixton, part of the Robert Browning Settlement. She also founded the Bourne Mission to fishermen in Hastings.

== Activism ==
=== To 1914 ===
Jane Strickland was first involved with the NSPCC, in 1890, its founder Benjamin Waugh being a relation by marriage: her sister-in-law Rosina, fourth daughter of Edmund Strickland, had married Samuel Boothroyd in 1882, and Waugh, as a relation of Boothroyd, had been one of the officiating ministers. Inkpin wrote that Strickland was "a dedicated Christian feminist to whom her religious faith was a crucial element of her being". There was a suffragist group in the Hastings area from 1883, including Elizabeth Eiloart, and Elizabeth Blackwell spoke at meetings.

Strickland wrote to the Hastings & St. Leonards Advertiser a letter published on 8 November 1906, querying the imprisonment of 12 suffragist women. She took part in the Mud March of 1907. She chaired the NUWSS area branch from 1909, but dissatisfaction that her choice of speakers was always from Liberal Party ranks led to a group breaking away; in 1910 it affiliated to the New Constitutional Society for Women's Suffrage.

Strickland became the President of Executive, with John Clifford as President, of the Free Church League for Women Suffrage (FCLWS) set up in 1910, at the instigation of Louisa Turquand, writing in the newspaper Christian Commonwealth with a Christian socialist editorial line. The founders were Turquand who became press secretary, Strickland and the Congregational minister Hatty Baker. As a statement of its position, the League included "The State refuses to recognise the personality of women, and is therefore at variance with Christianity, and must be brought into line", referencing "the Puritan idea of respect for personality".

In 1910 a Hastings meeting for the London Missionary Society at the Robertson Street Church heard from John Macgowan, a missionary in Amoy, about the work of the Heavenly Foot Society. Jane Strickland was there, with her husband as local treasurer, and her mother. Mrs. Robert Slade, who died in 1908, had donated to the work of the LMS.

In May 1913, Strickland made a statement to Hastings magistrates concerning the cancellation of a suffragist meeting at the Royal Concert Hall. It had been called off by the proprietor of the hall, William Slade (1854–1938), who was her younger brother. It followed earlier violence at a suffragist demonstration in the town. Strickland stated that the NUWSS who were organising the event were non-militant, and that the clash should be called an "Anti-Suffrage Riot".

=== Pacifism and World War I ===
By 1913, Strickland was a committee member the Hastings branch of the Peace and Arbitration Society. The Hastings society had been set up in 1912, announced by Joseph Joshua Green of Godwyn Lodge, a Quaker. It was a pacifist organisation linked to the series of Universal Peace Congresses, and the International Arbitration and Peace Association (IAPA). The IAPA had been founded in the United Kingdom around 1880. It had women members of its executive, as the International Peace Society then did not.

In Helena Swanwick's 1915 pamphlet Woman and War, Strickland appeared as a member of the General Council of the Union of Democratic Control. She was still involved in 1926.

In a letter to the Hastings and St Leonards Observer published on 13 July 1918, Strickland announced a protest meeting in London on 16 July of the FCLWS against the introduction of Regulation 40D of the Defence of the Realm Act 1914. The venue was the Bloomsbury Chapel, a Baptist church where the Rev. Thomas Phillips was Superintendent. She called the legislation a reintroduction of the Contagious Diseases Acts. Regulation 40D "prohibited any women who suffered from a communicable disease from having sexual intercourse with a member of His Majesty's Forces." Two weeks later, a polemical pseudonymous letter of reply signed "Querist" in the same newspaper brought up Strickland's support for the pacifist campaigning and stance of Frederick and Emmeline Pethick Lawrence; the FCLWS "having done little else than keep the Asquithian Government in office"; and assuming that Strickland had been imprisoned for suffragist activity, asking "what would have been the use of doing so, if she continues to work for the Pacifist Defeatism, which would give Germany a control of our country [...]?" The letter ended by stating that opponents of the regulation would be "suspect" if they did not break with "pro-Hun politicians".

=== Labour Party ===
Strickland, who had been a long-term Liberal, joined the Labour Party. She was appointed a magistrate in 1929.

== Works ==
- Young Sir Harry Vane (1904), booklet on Henry Vane the Younger in the "British Free Church heroes" published by A. H. Stockwell. She also wrote magazine articles.

== Family ==
Jane Slade married in 1878 Francis Strickland of Hastings, youngest son of Edmund Strickland, of Preston House. Edmund Strickland, a corn and seed merchant, retired at the end of 1889, and Francis took over the business. The couple had three sons and a daughter. The sons were:

- William Francis Norman Strickland apparent dates 1879–1943, MIs at .
- Arthur George Strickland (1880–1957), corn merchant. He made a first cousin marriage in 1907, to Hilda Mary Slade, a daughter of Jane's brother Robert. Their youngest son, Arthur Herbert Strickland, was an entomologist.
- Herbert Slade Strickland (born 10 February 1885) was killed in action on 3 September 1918 at Inchy with the Hawke Battalion of the 63rd (Royal Naval) Division.

=== Slade cousins ===
Under the will of Felix Slade, the collector and a benefactor who died in 1868, their cousin, William Slade and his brother Robert were left property in Brixton. Robert died in 1898, aged 72, the only brother; he was a corn merchant in Leeds, as their father had been. He had married in 1867, at Queen Street Chapel, Lydia Frances Holroyd, daughter of W. H. Holroyd, formerly of Louth, Lincolnshire, who died in 1909. Family houses used names commemorating properties associated with the elder Robert Slade, father of Felix Slade (Walcot Lodge in London, Halsteads at Thornton in Lonsdale).

Margaret Tyers Weller-Poley (died 1899), a descendant of Jonathan Tyers of the Vauxhall Gardens, left the Vauxhall Trust Estates in trust to William Slade and his nephew and niece, Robert Holroyd (1900) and Edith Marion Slade, children of his brother Robert. She was a cousin of William and Robert Slade, and the property was to be sold with proceeds invested. Her father the Rev. Jonathan Tyers Barrett had married Mary Slade, a niece of Robert Slade the elder. She was an heir of Felix Slade, but died in 1854 at Brandon House, predeceasing him. The collection at the Barrett and Poley family home, Brandon House, Brandon, Suffolk, was sold in 1919; it included porcelain from the collection of E. H. Preston.

== Legacy ==
The Jane Elizabeth Strickland Memorial Fund was a registered charity from 1932 to 1995.
