= Helen Bright Clark =

British suffragist

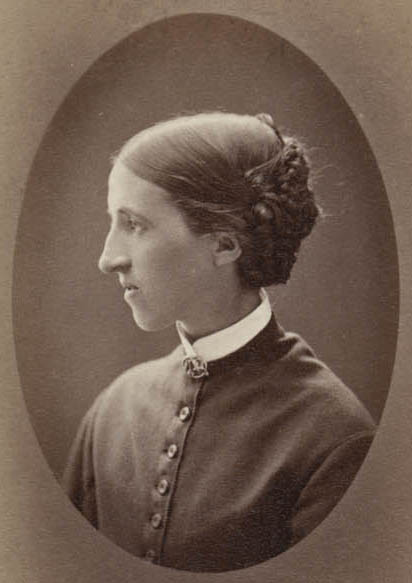
- Born: Helen Priestman Bright; 10 October 1840; Rochdale, Lancashire, England
- Died: 1 December 1927 (aged 87)
- Occupations: Suffragist, Activist
- Spouse: William Stephens Clark (m. 1866–1925) his death
- Father: John Bright
- Relatives: John Albert Bright (half-brother); William Leatham Bright (half-brother); Helen Rabagliati (cousin)

Helen Bright Clark (1840–1927) was a British women's rights activist and suffragist. The daughter of a radical Member of Parliament, Clark was a prominent speaker for women's voting rights and at times a political realist who served as a mainstay of the 19th century suffrage movement in South West England. A liberal in all senses, Clark aided progress toward universal human brotherhood through her activities in organisations which assisted former slaves and aboriginal peoples.

== Early life ==
In 1840, Clark was born Helen Priestman Bright in Rochdale, Lancashire, England to Quakers Elizabeth Priestman Bright and future Privy Council member, statesman John Bright. Clark's mother soon sickened and then died of tuberculosis in September 1841. John Bright's sister, Priscilla Bright, later Priscilla Bright McLaren, took the place of the mother and served an influential role in raising Clark. Six years after her mother's death, Clark's father remarried to Margaret Leatham, sister of Edward Aldam Leatham of Wakefield, in 1847. He eventually had seven more children, including John Albert Bright and William Leatham Bright.

As Helen Bright, Clark attended the Quaker school in Southport, under the tutelage of Hannah Wallis—this was the same school attended by her aunt Priscilla under the instruction of Wallis' mother. In 1851, aunt Priscilla bore a daughter Helen Priscilla McLaren.

== Women's suffrage ==
The Brights held in their house copies of essays written by John Stuart Mill, and young Helen Bright became especially interested in Mill's advocacy of the "enfranchisement of women"—the idea that the right to vote should be extended to women. In 1861 she wrote to her step-cousin Agnes McLaren, "how absurd to talk of repression and taxation going hand in hand, and all the while excluding wholly the one half of the population from the franchise." In 1866 as Helen Bright she signed the "Ladies' Petition" on suffrage being circulated by Elizabeth Garrett and Emily Davies, as did her former teacher Hannah Wallis. The petition with its 1,499 signatures was presented by Mill to the House of Commons in June 1866. Later that year, Helen Bright married William Stephens Clark (1839–1925) of Street, Somerset. William Clark was a liberal Quaker, the owner of C. & J. Clark the shoe makers, and member of a family friendly to the idea of women's rights: his sister and niece had also signed the suffrage petition.

Clark joined the Enfranchisement of Women Committee in 1866–67 and in 1870 was a member of the Manchester National Society for Women's Suffrage. Clark spoke publicly for the first time in 1872, giving a lecture in Taunton during a meeting organised by the Bristol and West of England National Society for Women's Suffrage. In her speech, she questioned the irony "that though it was perfectly right for a woman to dance at a public hall, the moment she ventured upon a public platform to advocate public peace, morality and justice, she was stepping out of her sphere."

On 9 March 1876 in the Victoria Rooms, Clifton, Bristol, Clark spoke strongly for the removal of the voting disabilities of women, in support of a parliamentary bill to that end introduced by a Mr. Forsyth. On 26 April, Clark's father John Bright, MP, spoke in the House of Commons against the bill, saying that "The Bill seems to be based on a proposition that is untenable ... it is a Bill based on an assumed hostility between the sexes."

On 23 January 1879 at Bristol, Clark gave a stirring speech for suffrage that was later printed and distributed as a four-page pamphlet. She noted that the struggle for women's suffrage was looked upon by many "as chiefly of a sentimental character" and that the over-riding "question of peace or war is to the front." Clark argued that women's political power should be called upon to advocate for peace and to allow society forward progress. Of the Parliamentary franchise, she said,

this movement I take to be a great symbol, and, as it were, the outward expression, of a great awakening, intellectual and moral, among women—and not only amongst the more scholarly, but among thousands of homely and religious women who have been especially impressed by the moral aspects of the political effacement of their sex.

Clark appeared in 1881 in front of the Bradford Demonstration for Women.

=== Liberal convention at Leeds, 1883 ===
In Leeds on 17–18 October 1883, a major convention was held, called by the National Liberal Federation, for the purpose of determining the Liberal stance on whether the political franchise should be extended to male householders in counties. Though John Bright was acknowledged leader of the Liberals, John Morley presided over the two days of debate among delegates from 500 Liberal associations. Two of a handful of women chosen as delegates included Bright's daughter Helen Bright Clark, and Jane Cobden, daughter of the radical statesman Richard Cobden. When Walter McLaren of Bradford made a motion on the first morning to include a resolution in favour of women's suffrage, the two women delegates spoke strongly in favour. Though Bright was considered a Radical and a Liberal, and though he had accompanied Mill during the presentation of the Ladies' Petition to the House, he was never personally in favour of women voting. In front of her father, 1,600 delegates, and an audience which included Susan B. Anthony visiting from America, Clark "made her impassioned appeal", bringing the audience to a "hushed and profound silence." Anthony described how heroic it seemed for a daughter to speak in faithfulness to her own highest convictions even when those convictions were "in opposition to her loved and honored father." Only 30 delegates voted against the resolution.

John Bright presided over a great public meeting held in the town hall on the evening of the second day. Some 5,000 appeared seeking entrance, but thousands were turned away for lack of room. Bright was introduced by Sir Wilfrid Lawson who joked that the resolution adopted by the conference was "somewhat in advance of the ideas of the speaker of the evening," a comment which elicited roars of laughter from the crowd and a grin of merriment from Bright. However, Bright's subsequent speech to the crowd, one which elucidated many of the high points of Liberal achievement, was seen by Anthony to avoid mention of the women's suffrage resolution and any acknowledgment of the small but significant steps toward women's emancipation that had taken place in the UK from 1866 to 1882.

== Moderation and peace ==
In May 1884, Clark broke with her aunt Priscilla Bright McLaren who was, with Ursula Mellor Bright, advocating more radical reform. Clark sided with Lydia Becker and her supporters who backed the couverture clause introduced by William Woodall to the Liberal Reform bill. Woodall's proposal was an incremental one: it sought votes for unmarried women only, not for wives. Clark gave her support on the grounds that this not wholly satisfactory clause had more chance of passing and could subsequently be used as a wedge by which women's suffrage could be expanded. Though he attempted several times through 1889, Woodall was unable to cement such a clause into a bill before the House.

Clark was among the signatories of a supportive letter sent to the first meeting of the International Council of Women, which was held in 1888 in America. Other signers included Margaret Tanner, Maria Colby, Emily Sturge, Mary Estlin and Louisa Swann, all under the title "In the Fellowship of Womanhood."

In the early 1890s, Elizabeth Cady Stanton travelled through Europe gathering support for, and inviting participation in, her work-in-progress The Woman's Bible. One evening, Stanton spoke to a crowd at Clark's home about the state of the suffrage movement in America. Local clergymen present questioned Stanton about the Bible's position of woman in relation to man, and Stanton described at length how equality among the sexes was supported by Bible verse, but that the Bible could be selectively quoted to support conflicting arguments. Because of this, said Stanton, it should be limited in its authority. Clark, though sympathetic to Stanton's views, expressed to Stanton her fear that some of the strictest of those in attendance might have been shocked by her ultra-liberal opinions.

In February 1900, Clark protested that the Methodist Times claimed that her father would have been a supporter of the Boer War, and wouldn't publish her response that instead he would have been an advocate for peace.

In 1914 as war was mounting in Europe, Clark joined the International Woman Suffrage Alliance (IWSA), a group of women who sought voting rights, most of whom advocated world peace. Clark signed an "Open Christmas Letter" addressed "To the Women of Germany and Austria" which was published in IWSA's Jus Suffragii in January 1915. Among the other 100 signers were Margaret Ashton, Emily Hobhouse, Sylvia Pankhurst and a wide range of women united by the wish for a quick end to hostilities. The letter was a plea for world peace among women, and was answered in kind by 155 Germanic feminists including Anita Augspurg, Lida Gustava Heymann and Rosa Mayreder. Carrie Chapman Catt in America, founder of IWSA, proposed that, instead of the annual IWSA meeting taking place in Berlin (which appeared impossible due to the war), an international congress of women should meet in The Hague on 28 April. Clark found that her position in the National Union of Women's Suffrage Societies (NUWSS) was in the minority: she advocated for NUWSS to send delegates to The Hague in April. However, NUWSS membership was primarily concerned with helping the UK men win the war.

== Racial equality ==
While still a child, Clark met Frederick Douglass during a trip he made to England, one in which he befriended John Bright. Clark heard Douglass speak about the state of racial inequality in America. When Douglass returned to England in 1886–87, he visited Clark once again at her home, and spoke about race oppression, caste barriers and African Americans' "total inability to protect themselves without the ballot of which they had been deprived by cruel persecution and the fraudulent manipulation of the ballot box." At this gathering, Clark's neighbour Catherine Impey, seeing Douglass for the second time, was inspired to launch a magazine called Anti-Caste in 1888, dedicated "to the interests of the coloured race;" the first anti-racism magazine in England.

In the 1860s, Clark became active in the UK branch of the Freedman's Aid Society which sought to assist former slaves in establishing basic yet comfortable homes. In the 1880s, Clark was a founding member of the Society for the Furtherance of Human Brotherhood. In 1906, with Helena Brownsword Dowson and Jane Cobden Unwin, Clark became active in the Aborigines' Protection Society.

== Personal life ==
Clark bore four daughters and two sons who were active in promoting humanitarian rights. Margaret Clark Gillett (1878–1962) was a botanist and suffragist. Alice Clark and her sister Esther Bright Clothier were successive secretaries of NUWSS. Hilda Clark was a physician, humanitarian and active in the peace movement. Roger Clark co-founded the Friends' League for Women's Suffrage, a Quaker group of reformers. Roger Clark's wife Sarah Bancroft Clark was a tax resister and suffragist active in several political groups. In 1900, Clark lived in Millfield, Street, Somerset, England.
