= Alice Clark (historian) =

British feminist and historian

Alice Clark (1 August 1874 – 11 May 1934) was a British feminist and historian.

== Life ==
Clark was a daughter of William Stephens Clark (1839-1925) and Helen Priestman Bright (1840–1927). The Clark family were Quakers, of shoe-making fame - C. and J. Clark Ltd. Manufacturer of boots, shoes & sheepskin rugs. One of Alice's sisters, Dr Hilda Clark, was an influential physician and specialist in the treatment of tuberculosis.

Clark studied at the London School Economics (LSE) under the supervision of Lilian Knowles. Alice Clark argued that in 16th century England, women were engaged in many aspects of industry and agriculture. The home was a central unit of production and women played a central role in running farms, and some trades and landed estates. Their useful economic roles gave them a sort of equality with their husbands. Clark argued, however, that as capitalism expanded in the 17th century, there was increasingly more division of labour with the husband taking paid labour jobs outside the home, leaving the wife reduced to unpaid household work. Middle-class women were confined to an idle domestic existence, supervising servants; lower-class women were forced to take poorly paid jobs. Clark therefore contended that capitalism had a negative effect on powerful women.

== Suffragist activities ==
The Clark family were involved in suffrage campaigning. Early in 1913, Alice Clark served on the executive committee of the National Union of Women’s Suffrage Societies (NUWSS). They ran a six-week-long suffrage pilgrimage, ending in a large rally in Hyde Park. Alice carried a Street Women’s Suffrage banner made by her sister Esther.

== Selected works ==
- Working life of women in the seventeenth century, 1916
