= Indian famine of 1896–1897 =

Famine in India

- Country: India, the princely states of Rajputana, Punjab Province, Central India Agency, and Hyderabad
- Location: United Provinces, Bombay Presidency, Berar, Punjab, Himachal Pradesh, Central Provinces, parts of Madras Presidency and princely states of central and southern India
- Period: 1896–1897
- Deaths from disease: Contemporary observers reported cholera and malaria epidemics accounting for additional mortality
- Total deaths: 3–5 million (famine and disease combined)
- Causes: drought, failure of the southwest monsoon; colonial economic policy (grain export, taxation)
- Net food imports: Significant imports from Burma reported
- Effect on demographics: Population decline in affected districts by up to 10%
- Consequences: Intensified debate on famine codes; major criticism of colonial relief policy
- Preceded by: Great Famine of 1876–1878
- Succeeded by: Indian famine of 1899–1900

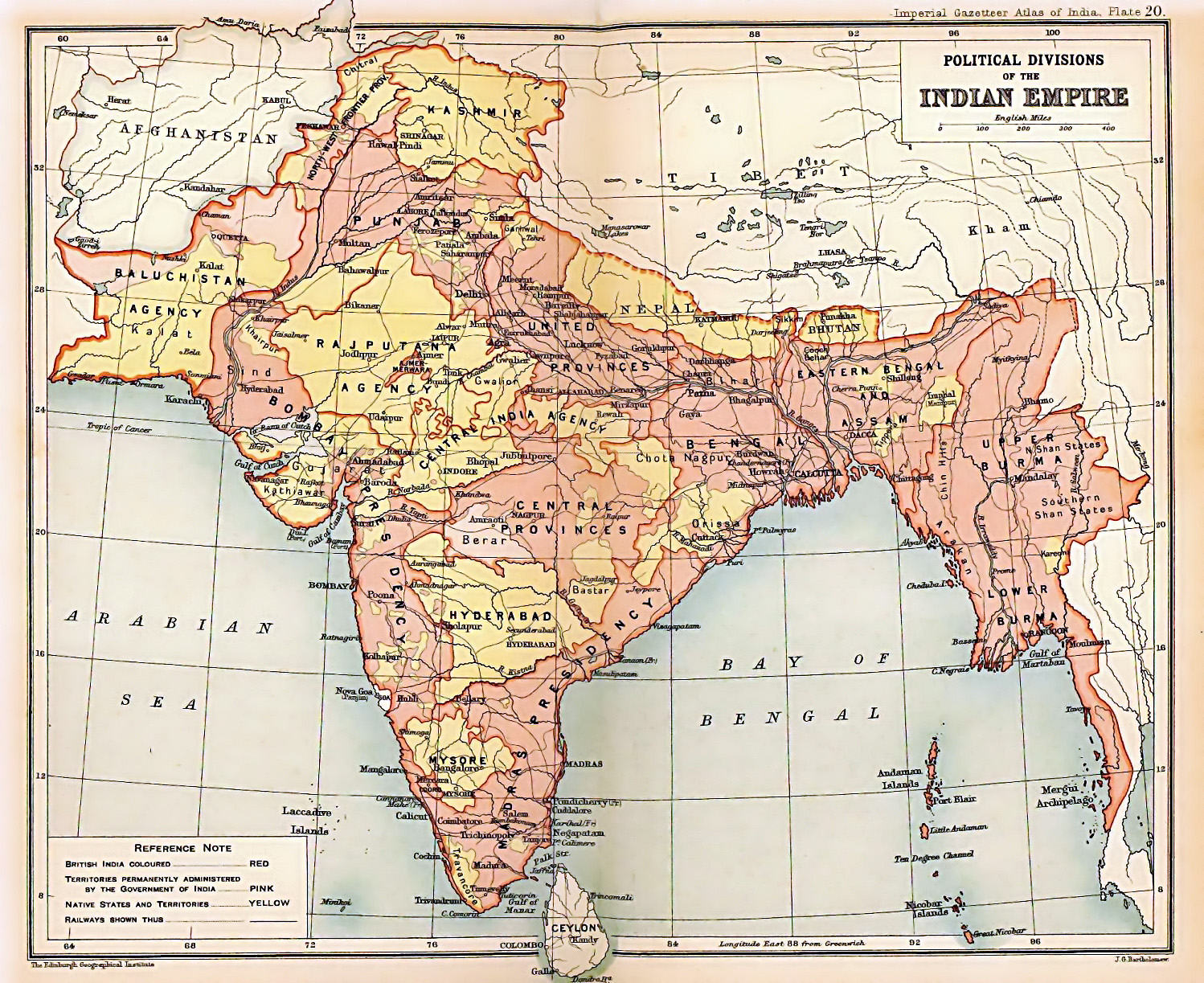
Map of the British Indian Empire (1909), showing the different provinces of British India and the princely states. The Central Provinces and Berar were especially hard-hit by the famine

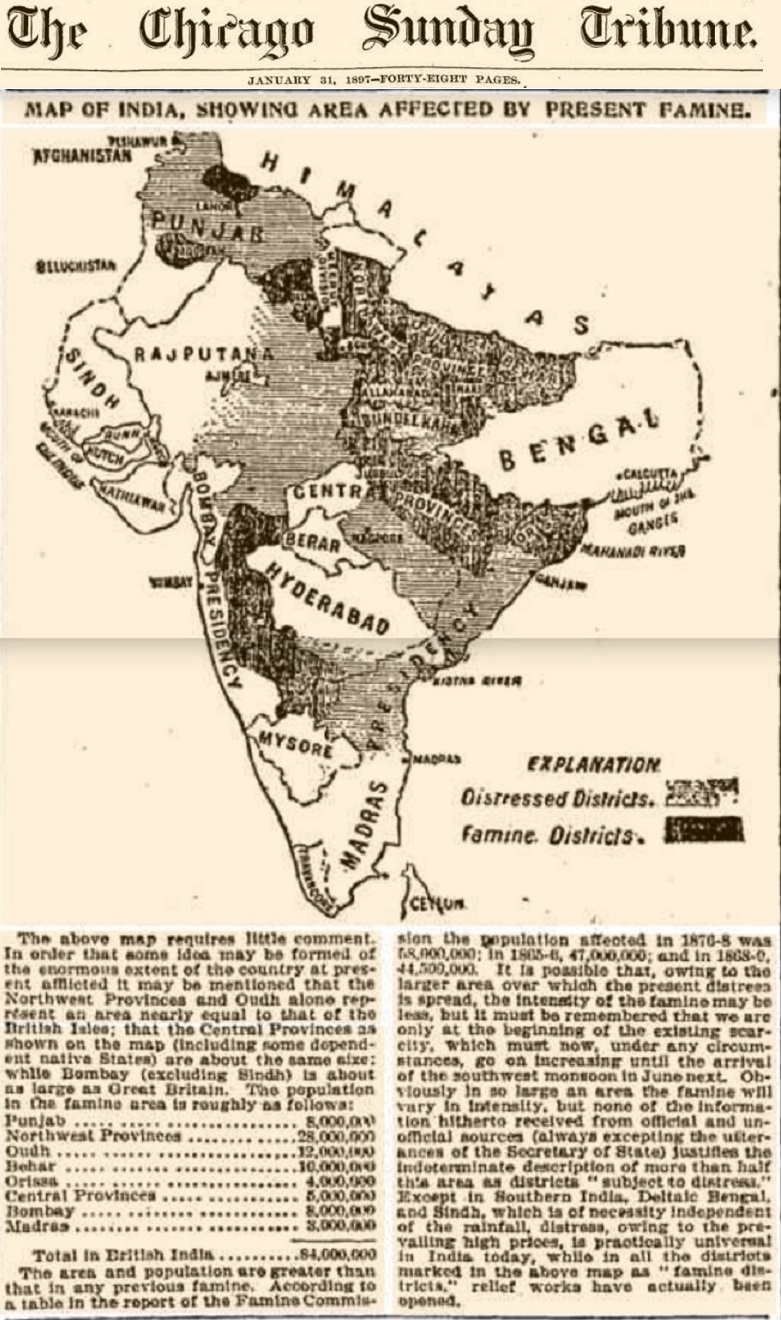
Map from Chicago Sunday Tribune, January 31, 1897, showing the areas in India affected by the famine.

The Indian famine of 1896–1897 was a famine that began in Bundelkhand, India, early in 1896 and spread to many parts of the country, including the United Provinces, the Central Provinces and Berar, Bihar, parts of the Bombay and Madras presidencies, and parts of the Punjab; in addition, the princely states of Rajputana, Central India Agency and Hyderabad were affected. During the two years, the famine affected an area of 307,000 square miles (800,000 km^{2}) and a population of 69.5 million. Although some relief was offered throughout the famine-stricken regions in accordance with the Provisional Famine Code of 1883, the mortality, both from starvation and accompanying epidemics, was very high. Contemporary colonial estimates placed the death toll at around one million, but later demographic research suggests that between 4.5 and 5 million people may have died as a result of famine and disease. Historians have linked the severity of the famine not only to rainfall failure but also to colonial economic policies, particularly grain export practices and restrictions on relief under the prevailing famine codes.

== Course ==
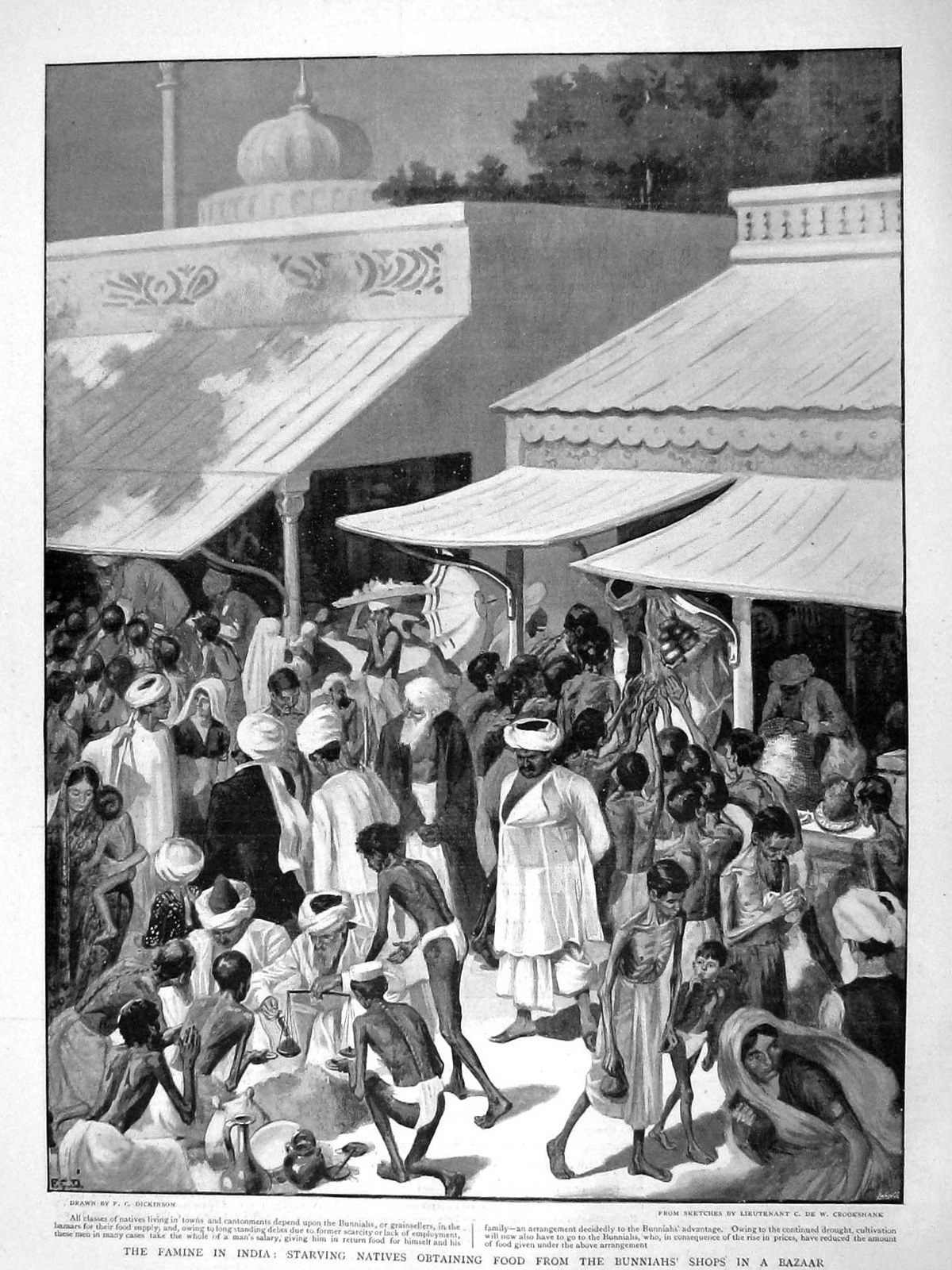
Drawing, titled "Famine in India," from The Graphic, February 27, 1897, showing a bazaar scene in India with shoppers, many of whom are emaciated, buying grain from a merchant's shop.

The Bundelkhand district of Agra Province experienced drought in the autumn of 1895 as a result of poor summer monsoon rains. When the winter monsoon failed as well, the provincial government declared a famine early in 1896 and began to organise relief. However, the summer monsoon of 1896 brought only scanty rains, and soon the famine had spread to the United Provinces, Central Provinces and Berar, portions of the presidencies of Bombay and Madras, and of the provinces of Bengal, Punjab, and even Upper Burma. The native states affected were Rajputana, Central India Agency, and Hyderabad. The famine affected mostly British India: of the total area of 307,000 square miles (800,000 km^{2}) affected, 225,000 square miles (580,000 km^{2}) lay in British territory; similarly, of the total famine-afflicted population of 67.5 million, 62.5 million lived in British territory.

The summer monsoon rains of 1897, however, were abundant, as was the following harvest which ended the famine in autumn 1897. However, the rains, which were particularly heavy in some regions, set off a malaria epidemic which killed many people; soon thereafter, an epidemic of the bubonic plague began in the Bombay Presidency, which although not very lethal during the famine year, would, in the next decade, become more virulent and spread to the rest of India.

== Famine relief ==
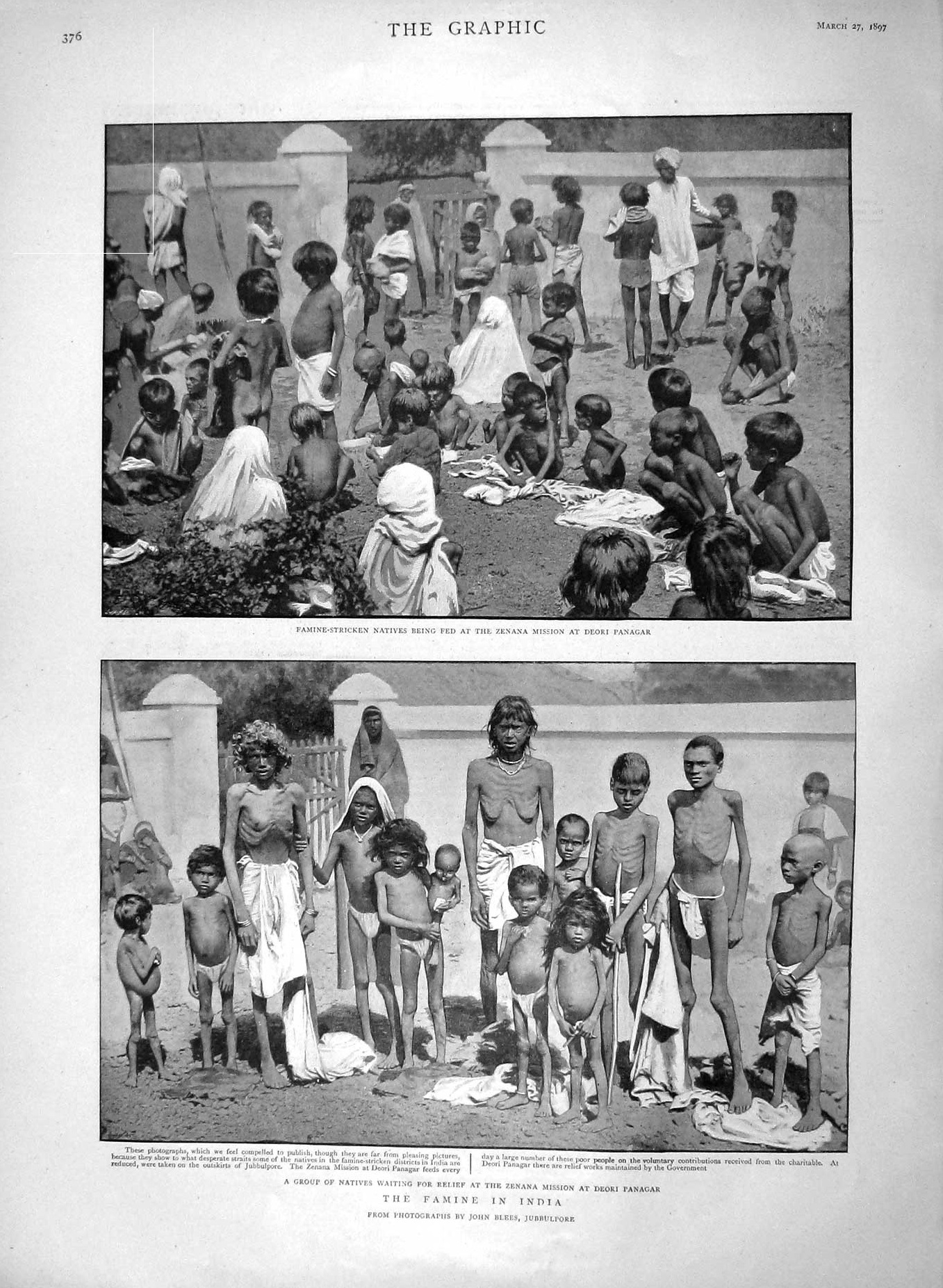
Famine relief at the Zenana Mission at Deori Panagar, near Jabalpur, India, March 1897

A decade earlier, in 1883, the Provisional Famine Code had been promulgated soon after the report of the first Indian Famine Commission was submitted in 1880. Now, guided by the Code, relief was organised for 821 million units at a cost of Rs. 72.5 million (then approx. £4,833,500). Revenue (tax) was remitted to the tune of Rs. 12.5 million (£833,350) and credit totalling Rs. 17.5 million (£1,166,500) was given. A charitable relief fund collected a total of Rs. 17.5 million (£1,166,500) of which Rs. 1.25 were collected in Great Britain.

Even so, the mortality resulting from the famine was great; it is thought that in the British territory alone, between 750,000 and 1 million people died of starvation. Pravin Visaria and Arup Maharatna, using census back-projections, estimate that 4.5 to 5 million deaths occurred during the famine years once famine-related epidemics are included. Mike Davis similarly stresses that mortality was far higher than official figures suggest, describing the famine as part of the wider wave of "Late Victorian famines" in which colonial trade policies and limited relief intensified vulnerability. Although the famine relief was reasonably effective in the United Provinces, it failed in the Central Provinces, especially among tribal groups, who were reluctant to perform labour in public works to earn food rations, and who, according to Famine Code guidelines, did not qualify for "charitable relief."

== Weavers in the Bombay Presidency ==
The Famine Commission of 1880 had made special provisions for the relief of weavers, who practised the only trade other than agriculture that employed rural Indians. The commission had recommended that weavers be given relief by offering them monetary advances for weaving coarse cloth or wool that could then be used in poor-houses or hospitals. This was preferable, it was felt, to having them produce the finer cloth of their trade, such as silk, for which there was no demand during a famine.

However, by 1896, the rural weavers in the Bombay Presidency, who were now having to compete with the increasing number of local cotton mills, were already in dire economic straits. Consequently, when the famine began, not only were they the first to apply for relief, but also did so in numbers that were much larger than had been anticipated. Since the government could now offer only limited relief to them in their own trade because of the large capital required, the majority of weavers—either of their own accord or as a result of official dictate—sought the conventional "relief works," which included earth-works and the breaking of rock and metal for building roads.

== Tribal groups in Chota Nagpur ==
In Chota Nagpur, East India, awareness of the famine came late in 1896 when it was discovered that the rice crop in the highlands of Manbhum district had failed entirely on account of very little rain the previous summer. The rice, grown on small terraces cut into the hillsides and forming staggered step-like patterns, was completely dependent on the monsoon: the only means of irrigation being water from the summer rains which flooded these terraces and which was then allowed to stand until mid-autumn when the crop ripened. The region also had a large proportion of tribal groups including Santals and Mundas who had traditionally relied on forest produce for some of their food intake.

As the local government began to plan relief measures for the famine, they included, in the list of food resources available, forest produce for the tribal groups; the planned government-sponsored relief for these groups was accordingly reduced. The previous decades, however, had seen large-scale deforestation in the area, and what forest that remained was either in private hands or in reserves. The tribal groups, whose accessible forests were now few and far between, consequently, first endured malnutrition and later, in their weakened state, fell prey to a cholera epidemic which killed 21 people per thousand.

== Food exports in Madras Presidency ==
Although the famine in the Madras Presidency was preceded by a natural calamity in the form of a drought, it was made more acute by the government's policy of laissez faire in the trade of grain. For example, two of the worst famine-afflicted areas in the Madras Presidency, the districts of Ganjam and Vizagapatam, continued to export grains throughout the famine. The table below shows exports and imports for the two districts during a five-year period beginning in 1892.

Foodgrain export from districts in Madras Presidency affected by Indian famine of 1896–97
	Sea-borne Trade		Rail-borne Trade
Year	Ganjam	Vizag	Ganjam & Vizagapatam
1892–93	13,508 tons exported	7,585 tons imported	
1893–94	17,817 tons exported	742 tons imported	79 tons imported into V.
1894–95	12,334 tons exported	89 tons exported	7,683 tons imported into V.
1895–96	31,559 tons exported	4 tons exported	5,751 tons exported
1896–97	34,371 tons exported	414 tons exported	7,997 tons exported

== Cattle in the Deccan ==
Farming in the dry Deccan region of the Bombay Presidency required more farm animals—typically bullocks to pull the heavier ploughs—than were needed in other, wetter, regions of India; often, up to six bullocks were needed for ploughing. For most of the first half of the 19th century, farmers in the Deccan did not own enough bullocks to farm effectively. Consequently, many plots were ploughed only once every three or four years.

In the second half of the 19th century, cattle numbers per farmer did increase; however, the cattle remained vulnerable to famines. When the crops failed, people were driven to change their diets and eat seeds and fodder. Consequently, many farm animals, especially bullocks, slowly starved. The famine of 1896–97 proved particularly devastating for bullocks; in some areas of the Bombay Presidency, their numbers had not recovered some 30 years later.

== Epidemics ==
Epidemics of many diseases, especially cholera and malaria, usually accompanied famines. In 1897, an epidemic of the bubonic plague broke out as well in the Bombay Presidency and, in the next decade, would spread to many parts of the country. However, other diseases took a bigger toll during the famine of 1896–97.

Typically, deaths from cholera and dysentery and diarrhoea peaked before the rains as large groups of people collected on a daily basis to receive famine relief. Malaria epidemics, on the other hand, usually began after the first rains when the famine-afflicted population left the relief-camps for their villages; there, new pools of standing water attracted the mosquito-borne virus to which their already enfeebled condition offered little resistance. The following table compares the number of deaths due to different diseases occurring in the famine year with the average number occurring in the five years preceding the famine in the Central Provinces and Berar and the Bombay Presidency. In each case, the mortality had increased during the famine year; this included the small number of officially registered suicides included in the "injuries" category below.

Death rates (per thousand) from different causes during the Indian famine of 1896–97
	Central Provinces and Berar		Bombay Presidency	
Cause of death	1891–95 Pre-famine years (average)	1897 Famine year	1891–95 Pre-famine years (average)	1897 Famine year
Cholera	1.79	6.01	1.30	3.03
Smallpox	0.24	0.38	0.14	0.20
Fevers (especially Malaria)	21.28	40.98	21.12	24.59
Dysentery/Diarrhea	1.85	8.53	1.87	4.57
Injuries	0.56	0.79	0.31	0.37
All others and unknown	8.14	12.64	4.84	7.08
Combined Death Rate	33.86	69.34	29.58	39.84

== Mortality ==
Estimates of the total famine related deaths during this period vary. The following table gives the varying estimates of total famine related deaths between 1896 and 1902 (including both the 1899–1900 famine and the famine of 1896–1897).

Estimate (in millions)	Done by	Publication
8.4	Arup Maharatna; Ronald E. Seavoy	The Demography of Famines: An Indian Historical Perspective, New Delhi: Oxford University Press, 1996; Famine in Peasant Societies (Contributions in Economics and Economic History), New York: Greenwood Press, 1986
6.1	Cambridge Economic History of India	The Cambridge Economic History of India, Volume 2, Cambridge University Press, 1983

== Aftermath ==
Both the famine and the relief efforts were painstakingly analysed by the Famine Commission of 1898 presided by Sir James Broadwood Lyall, the former Lieutenant-Governor of the Punjab. The Commission affirmed the broad principles of famine relief enunciated by the first Famine Commission of 1880, but made a number of changes in implementation. They recommended increasing the minimum wage in the "relief works," and extending gratuitous (or charitable) relief during the rainy season. They also defined new rules for relief of "aboriginal and hill tribes" who had been found difficult to reach in 1896–97; in addition, they stressed generous remissions of land revenue. The recommendations were soon to be tested in the Indian famine of 1899–1900.

== See also ==
- Tamil Nadu famine (1891)
- Indian famine of 1899–1900
- Famine in India
- Timeline of major famines in India during British rule
- Company rule in India
- Drought in India
