= Indian famine of 1899–1900 =

Famine in India

- Country: British India
- Location: Bombay Presidency, Central Provinces, Mysore, Rajputana, Punjab, Himachal Pradesh, Uttarkhand
- Period: 1899–1900
- Total deaths: 1–4.5 million
- Causes: Drought, colonial policies
- Relief: Famine Codes

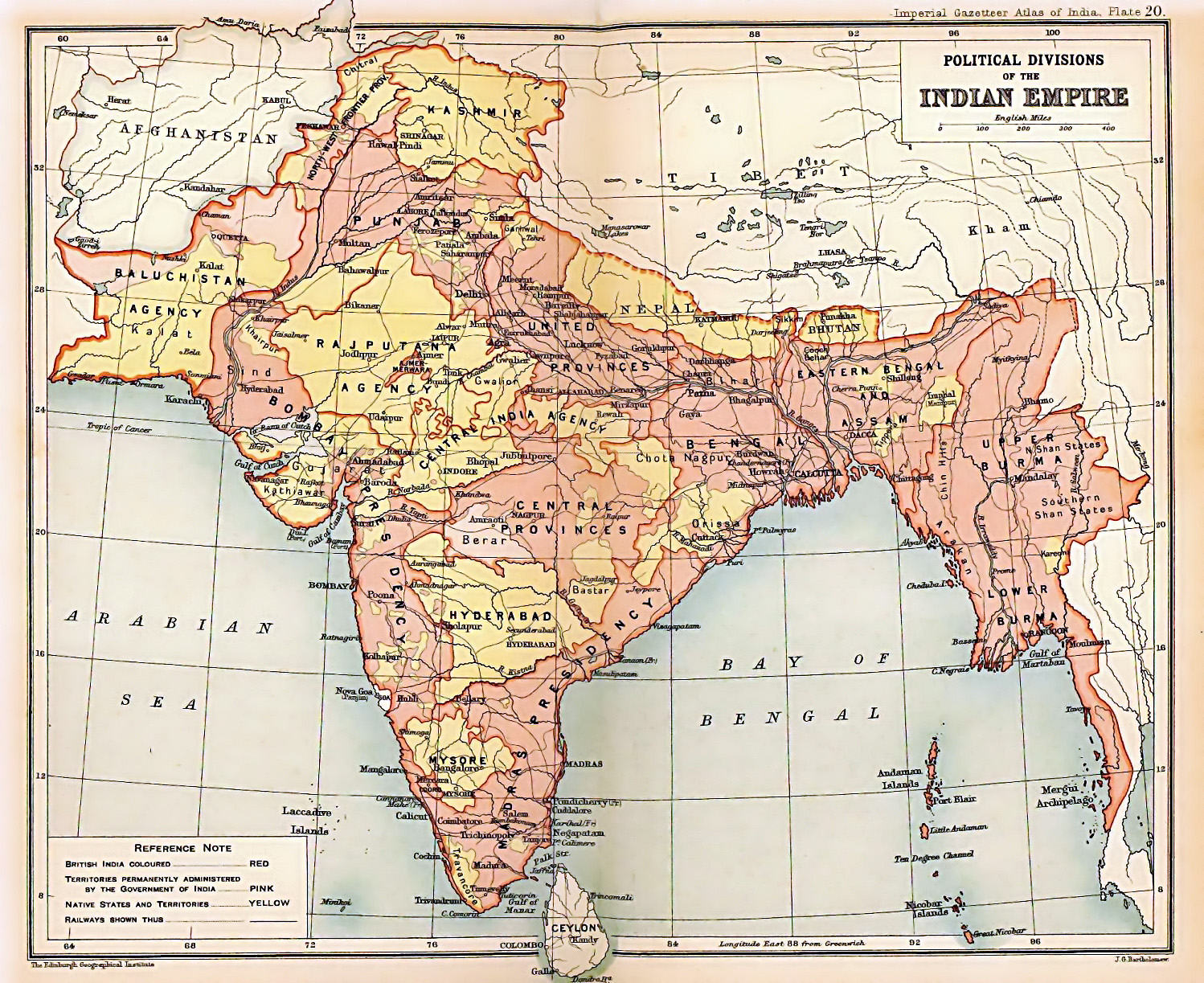
Map of the British Indian Empire (1909), showing the different provinces and native states. The Central Provinces and Berar, Bombay Presidency, Ajmer-Merwara, and the Hissar district of the Punjab were especially hard-hit by the famine of 1899–1900.

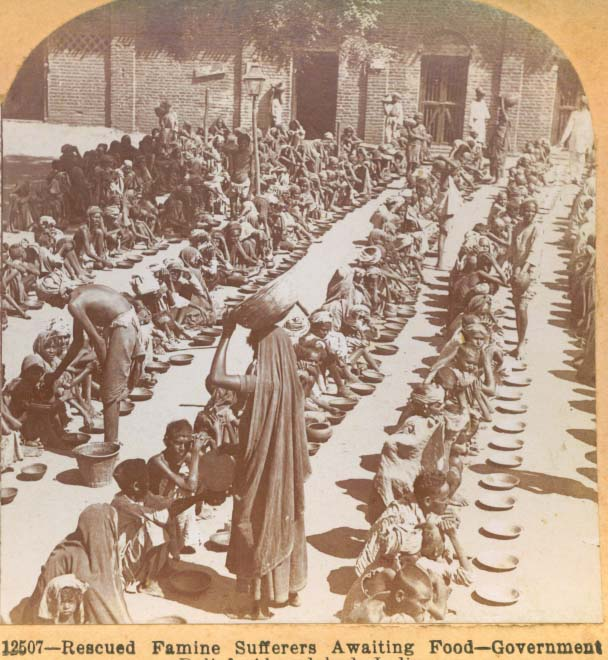
Government famine relief, c. 1901, Ahmedabad

The Indian famine of 1899–1900 began with the failure of the summer monsoons in 1899 over Western and Central India and, during the next year, affected an area of 476,000 square miles (1,230,000 km^{2}) and a population of 59.5 million. The famine was acute in the Central Provinces and Berar, the Bombay Presidency, the minor province of Ajmer-Merwara, and the Hissar District of the Punjab; it also caused great distress in the princely states of the Rajputana Agency, the Central India Agency, Hyderabad and the Kathiawar Agency. In addition, small areas of the Bengal Presidency, the Madras Presidency and the North-Western Provinces were significantly affected by the famine.

The population in many areas had barely recovered from the famine of 1896–1897. As in that famine, this one too was preceded by a drought. The Meteorological Office of India in its report of 1900, stated, "The mean average rainfall of India is 45 inches (1,100 mm). In no previous famine year has it been in greater defect than 5 inches (130 mm). But in 1899 the defect exceeded 11 inches." There were also large crop failures in the rest of India and, as a result, inter-regional trade could not be relied upon to stabilise food prices.

The resulting mortality was high. 462,000 people died in the Bombay Presidency, and in the Deccan Plateau, the estimated death toll was 166,000. In the Presidency, the famine of 1899–1900 had the highest mortality—at 37.9 deaths per 1000—among all famines and scarcities there between 1876–77 and 1918–19. According to a 1908 estimate of The Imperial Gazetteer of India, in the British-administered districts alone, approximately one million people died of starvation or accompanying disease; in addition, as a result of acute shortage of fodder, millions of cattle also perished. Other estimates vary between one million (Note: "In the later nineteenth century there was a series of disastrous crop failures in India leading not only to starvation but to epidemics. Most were regional, but the death toll could be huge. Thus, to take only some of the worst famines for which the death rate is known, some 800,000 died in the North West Provinces, Punjab, and Rajasthan in 1837–38; perhaps 2 million in the same region in 1860–61; nearly a million in different areas in 1866–67; 4.3 million in widely spread areas in 1876–78, an additional 1.2 million in the North West Provinces and Kashmir in 1877–78; and, worst of all, over 5 million in a famine that affected a large population of India in 1896–97. In 1899–1900 more than a million were thought to have died, conditions being worse because of the shortage of food following the famines only two years earlier. Thereafter the only major loss of life through famine was in 1943 under exceptional wartime conditions.(p. 132)") and 4.5 million deaths.

== Causes ==
Historians view the famine as the result of an interaction between climatic shock and a political economy that prioritised revenue stability, global markets, and imperial military obligations over subsistence security. The combination of rigid revenue collection, continued exports, restricted relief, and official denial of state culpability has led scholars to describe the 1899–1900 famine as both a humanitarian disaster and an indictment of colonial governance.

=== Failure of the summer monsoon ===
In the Central Provinces and Berar, an area that had suffered extreme distress during the famine of 1896–1897, the year 1898 had been favourable agriculturally, as was the first half of 1899; however, after the failure of the summer monsoon of 1899, a second catastrophe began soon afterwards. There was a rapid rise of prices and the autumn kharif harvest failed completely. After public criticism of the relief effort in the previous famine, this time an improved relief effort was organised; by July 1900, one-fifth of the province's population was on some form of famine relief. The summer monsoon of 1900 produced moderately abundant rainfall, and by autumn, agricultural work had begun; most famine-relief works were consequently closed by December 1900. Overall, the famine of 1899–1900 was less severe in this region than the famine of two years before. In the Bombay Presidency, the reverse was the case: the famine of 1899–1900, which affected a population of 12 million, was more acute, especially in the Kathiawar Agency. The recovery from the famine in the Presidency was also very slow.

=== Colonial policy ===
Scholars have emphasised that the 1899–1900 famine was not simply a result of monsoon failure but was greatly shaped by the policies of the colonial administration. The British Indian government had developed a system of "Famine Codes" following earlier crises, yet these provisions were applied within a rigid fiscal and ideological framework that limited their effectiveness.

One of the central issues was taxation. Despite harvest failures, land revenue assessments were seldom reduced, and in many districts peasants were required to pay tax before they could qualify for relief. Bhatia records that "remissions were given only grudgingly and were not proportional to the scale of crop loss," meaning cultivators often had to borrow at high interest or sell land to meet obligations. These demands, according to Elizabeth Whitcombe, created a cycle in which famine intensified indebtedness and land alienation, leaving cultivators more vulnerable to subsequent scarcity.

Grain exports and commercial crop production further deepened scarcity. Even in districts reporting famine conditions, wheat and cotton continued to be exported to international markets through Bombay. Mike Davis has described this as "the paradox of dearth amidst plenty," in which India was integrated into global commodity flows at the expense of local subsistence. This pattern reflected the structural priorities of the colonial economy, which privileged exports of raw materials and collection of customs revenue over ensuring domestic food security.

Relief measures were formally guided by the Famine Codes of 1883, which stipulated relief works, food-for-labour programmes, and gratuitous aid for the destitute. However, these codes were implemented in ways that restricted access. Relief wages were deliberately kept below prevailing market levels for unskilled labour, in line with the principle that famine relief should not create "dependency" or discourage work. Labourers were often compelled to travel long distances to reach work sites, and the tasks, such as road or canal construction, were physically demanding, with meagre rations insufficient to sustain heavy exertion. Overcrowding and poor sanitation in relief camps contributed to the spread of cholera and malaria, compounding mortality.

The official framing of the famine strongly emphasised natural causes. Administrative reports attributed distress primarily to the failure of the monsoon, plague outbreaks, and locust damage. Fiscal and trade policies received little critical attention. This emphasis has been linked by later historians to the laissez-faire orthodoxy prevalent in late-Victorian imperial governance. The government maintained that interference in grain markets, such as by banning exports or subsidising imports, would distort prices and discourage private traders.

Criticism of this stance was voiced at the time by Indian nationalists and sections of the press. The Indian Spectator and other periodicals condemned the persistence of exports during famine, while leaders such as Dadabhai Naoroji and Gopal Krishna Gokhale cited the famine as evidence of the exploitative nature of colonial rule. Their critiques emphasised that India's agrarian surplus was drained to finance imperial trade and military expenditure, rather than invested in irrigation or rural welfare.

Military priorities also constrained relief. Substantial revenues were allocated to imperial defence and campaigns on the North-West Frontier at the same time that famine relief was underfunded. According to Dutt, this reflected the broader fiscal pattern of colonial India, where the "Home Charges" and military spending consistently took precedence over famine preparedness and rural infrastructure.

== Epidemics ==
Both 1896 and 1899 were El Niño years—years in which the monsoon rainfall was considerably less than average. The year following the El Niño, also called a Niño+1 year, has historically been recognised to have not only higher than average rainfall, but also a much higher probability of malaria epidemics. For example, in the Punjab province of British India, of the 77 years from 1867 to 1943, there were 21 El Niño years, 11 of whose Niño+1 years produced malaria epidemics; in contrast, there were only six malaria epidemics in the remaining 56 non-El Niño years. "Fever years follow famine years" had become a popular saying in the Punjab long before Sir Ronald Ross, working in the Presidency General Hospital in Calcutta, showed in 1898 that the malaria parasite, Plasmodium falciparum, is transmitted by mosquitoes. It had also been noted, by R. Christophers in 1911, that years in which the monsoon was abundant, but which had not been preceded by famine years, were not likely to be epidemic years. These observations had prompted some scholars to theorise that the increased malaria mortality in a post-famine year was the result of lowered resistance to malaria caused by the malnutrition. However, it is now thought likely that the dry famine years decreased human exposure to mosquitoes, which thrive in stagnant water, and consequently to Plasmodium falciparum; the decreased exposure resulted in lowered immunity among the population, thereby making subsequent exposures all the more devastating.

In 1900, a Niño+1 year, malaria epidemics occurred in the Punjab, Central Provinces and Berar, and the Bombay Presidency, with devastating results. In the Central Provinces and Berar, the death rates were initially quite low. The Report on the Famine in the Central Provinces in 1899–1900 noted the "extreme healthiness of the first four months of the famine, September to December 1899." The low mortality indicated the absence of malaria in 1899; however, by the summer of 1900, an epidemic of cholera had begun, and soon the monsoon rains of 1900 brought on the malaria epidemic. Consequently, the death rate peaked between August and September 1900, a full year after the famine began. In the Bombay Presidency, the same pattern of pre-monsoon cholera followed by post-monsoon malaria in 1900 was repeated. The Report on the Famine in the Bombay Presidency, 1899–1902 pronounced the epidemic to be "unprecedented," noting that "It attacked all classes and was by no means confined to the people who had been on relief works ..."

Parts of Punjab region, specially Bagar tract, were also affected.

== Usury ==
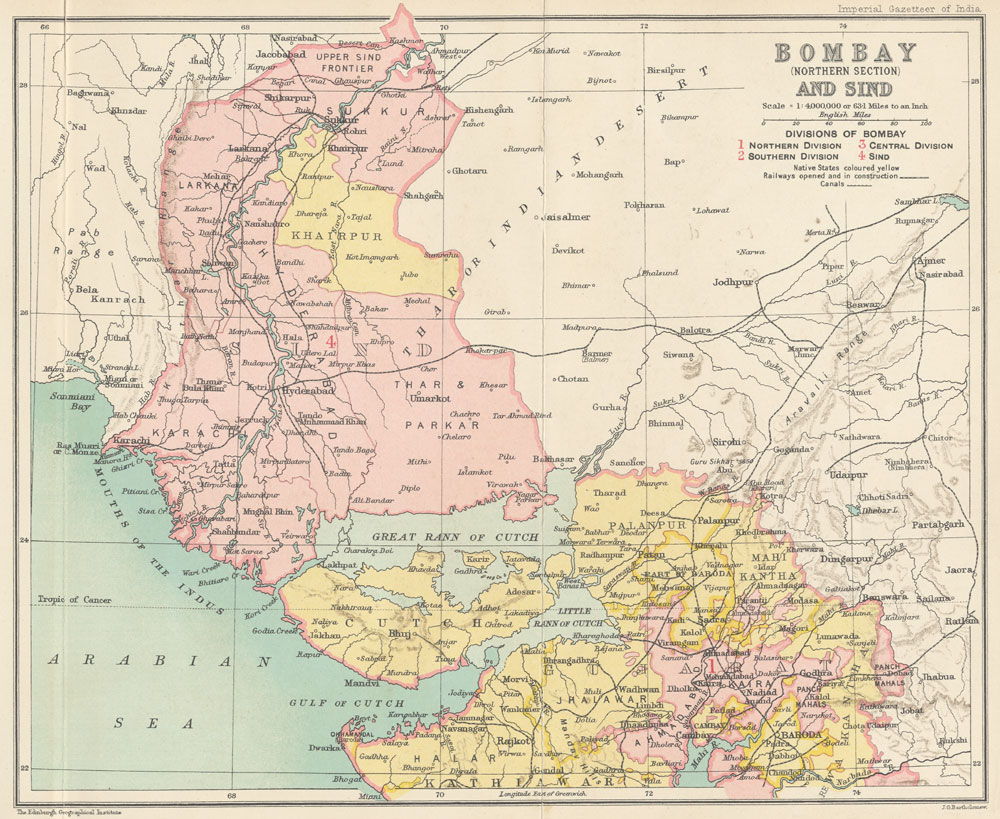
A map of the northern Bombay Presidency showing the districts of Khaira, Panchmahals, and the princely state of Baroda (bottom right). The princely state of Jodhpur is shown at the top right.

The British had established control over Western India in the early decades of the 19th century; this consisted of direct administration of the conquered territories in the expanded Bombay Presidency as well as in the British outpost of Ajmer-Merwara farther north. The middle decades of the 19th century saw not only the implementation of a new system of land revenue and land rights in these areas, but also the establishment of new civil law. Under the new land rights system, peasants could be dispossessed of their land if they failed to pay the land-revenue (or land-tax) in a timely fashion. The British, however, continued to rely on local Baniya usurers, or Sahukars, to supply credit to the peasants. The imposition of the new system of civil law, however, meant that the peasants could be exploited by the sahukars, who were often able, through the new civil courts, to acquire title-deeds to a peasant's land for non-payment of debt.

The mid-19th century was also a time of predominance of the economic theories of Adam Smith and David Ricardo, and the principle of laissez-faire was subscribed to by many colonial administrators; the British, consequently, declined to interfere in the markets. This meant that the Baniya sahukars could resort to hoarding during times of scarcity, driving up the price of food grain, and profiteering in the aftermath. All this occurred in Western India during the famine of 1899–1900.

In Kaira District in present-day Gujarat, many peasants were forced to hand over their lands to the sahukars as security for meager loans that not only didn't grant them much relief, but that they later couldn't repay on account of exorbitant interest. The sahukars were to foreclose on these loans in the years after the famine; in the princely state of Baroda, for example, the recorded land-transfers were to jump from an average of 13,000 per year during the decade of the 1890s, to over 65,000 during the year 1902–1903.

The sahukars, in their effort to drive up prices, were even able to export grain out of areas of scarcity using the faster means of transport that came in with British rule. Here again the colonial administrators declined to intervene, even though they themselves often disapproved of the practice. This happened, for example, in the Panchmahals—one of the worst famine-afflicted areas in 1900—where a railway line had been built in the 1890s. A British deputy district collector recorded in his report, "The merchants first cleared large profits by exporting their surplus stocks of grain at the commencement of the famine, and, later on by importing maize from Cawnpore and Bombay and rice from Calcutta and Rangoon." He went on to record that the sahukars were building new houses for themselves from these windfall profits. The blatant profiteering, however, led to grain riots in the Panchmahals by Bhil tribals, and grain riots became a feature of other British-ruled areas during times of famine. This contrasted markedly with the princely states, where the authorities often did intervene. For example, in Jodhpur State, a famine-stricken area in Rajputana, in August 1899, the state officials set up a shop to sell grain at cost price, forcing the Baniya merchants to eventually bring down their prices.

== Economic changes ==
The Indian famine of 1899–1900 was the last of the all-India famines. (The war-time Bengal famine of 1943 was confined mainly to Bengal and some neighbouring regions.) The famine proved to be a watershed between the overwhelmingly subsistence agriculture economy of 19th century India and a more diversified economy of the 20th century, which, by offering other forms of employment, created less agricultural disruption (and, consequently, less mortality) during times of scarcity.

The construction of the Indian Railways between 1860 and 1920, and the opportunities thereby offered for greater profit in other markets, allowed farmers to accumulate assets that could then be drawn upon during times of scarcity. By the early 20th century, many farmers in the Bombay presidency were growing a portion of their crop for export. Wheat, both food and cash crop, saw increased production and export during this time; in addition, cotton and oil-seeds were also exported. The railways also brought in food, whenever expected scarcities began to drive up food prices.

There were other changes in the economy as well: a construction boom in the Bombay presidency, in both the private and public sectors, during the first two decades of the 20th century, created a demand for unskilled labour. There was greater demand for agricultural labour as well, brought on both by the planting of more labour-intensive crops and the expansion of the cropped area in the presidency. Real agricultural wages, for example, increased sharply after 1900. All these provided farmers with greater insurance against famine. During times of drought, they could now seek seasonal non-agricultural employment; alternatively, they could temporarily move to areas where there was no drought and work as agricultural wage labourers.

According to (McAlpin 1979, p. 156), "Famines in the nineteenth century tended to be characterized by some degree of aimless wandering of agriculturalists after their own supplies of food had run out." Since these migrations caused further depletion among individuals who were already malnourished and since new areas exposed them to unfamiliar disease pathogens, the attendant mortality was high. In the 20th century, however, these temporary migrations became more purposive, especially from regions (in the Bombay Presidency) that were highly drought prone. A greater availability of jobs throughout the presidency and a better organised system of famine relief offered by the provincial government allowed most men in afflicted villages to migrate elsewhere as soon as their own meager harvest had been collected. McAlpin further notes:

Villages are reported to have housed only women and children, and old men in some years of crop failure. Those left behind could tend the livestock, live off the short harvest, and expect that the government would step in to provide relief—including grain sales or gratuitous relief—if necessary. With the beginning of the next agricultural season the men would return to the village with some earnings from their outside employment which could be used to resume agricultural operations. In most cases, the livestock would also have been preserved through the actions of women and children.

== Mortality ==
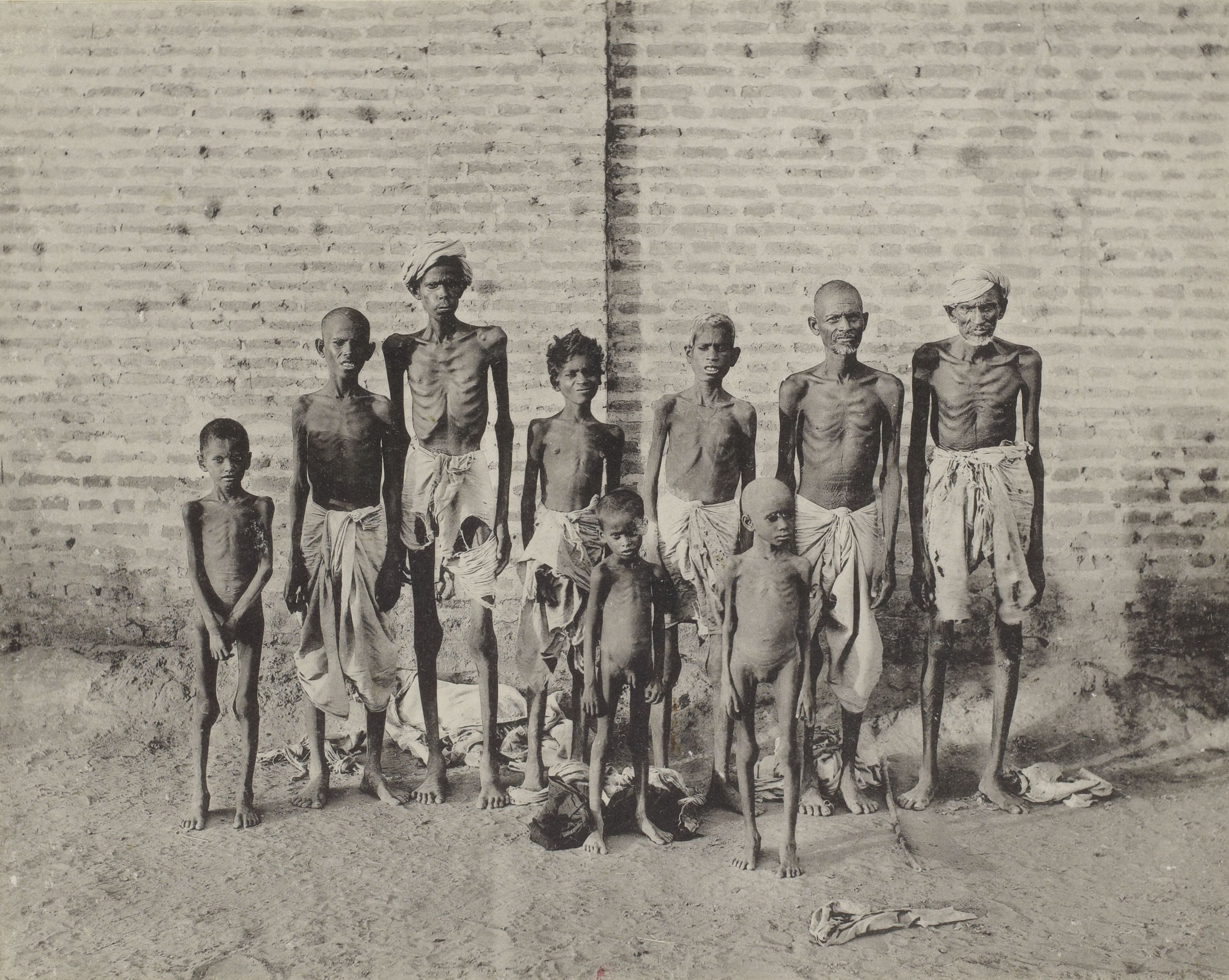
Group of men and children suffering from famine in India.

Estimates of the excess mortality during the famine vary widely. According to historian David Fieldhouse, over 1 million people may have died during the famine of 1899–1900. However, according to anthropologist Brian Fagan, "No one knows exactly how many perished in the great famine, but it could have been as many as four and a half million people." In her study of famines in the Bombay Presidency during the period 1860–1920, South Asianist, Michelle McAlpin estimated the famine of 1899–1900 to have had the highest mortality—at 37.9 deaths per 1000—among all famines and scarcities there between 1876–77 and 1918–19. Anthropologist Daniel W. Attwood asserts that in the Deccan an estimated 166,000 people may have died, and in the entire Presidency a total of 462,000. Historian Ronald E. Seavoy, in his 1986 study on famine in peasant societies, estimates the mortality in the famine to be 3.2 million, whereas historian Aroop Maharatna, in his historical retrospective of the demography of Indian famines, estimates the mortality to be between 3 million and 4.4 million. Archaeologist Daniel T. Chamberlain, citing Maharatna, points out that in Berar Province, the overall mortality rate in 1900 was 150% higher than the baseline rate, and further, also citing Maharatna, that the famine's effect can be seen in the sharp increase in crude death rate (to approximately 9%) in 1900, a sharp drop in the crude birth rate (down to 3%) in 1901, and a "compensating" increase in the birth rate (to approximately 5.5%) in 1902. Public health physician Mark E. Keim considers the mortality in India in the year 1900 to be 1.25 million, and the drought in India that year to be the fifth worst by mortality in the 20th century. Environment and development scholar Arun Agrawal argues that on account of the more liberal government relief in 1898 and 1899, "the number of people who died was far fewer" than in the famine of 1896–97 (whose mortality he puts at nearly 5 million). However anthropologist Fagan considers the famine in 1899–1900 to be the worst on record, suggesting that although the viceroy, Lord Curzon "led the public appeals for humanitarian aid, ... (t)he initiatives from his government ... were grossly inadequate."

Other estimates are by nonfiction-ecology author Michael Allaby who states that 1.25 million starved and 2 million died of disease in the famine of 1899–1900; and by historian Martin Gilbert, who in his Routledge Atlas of British History puts the mortality for this famine in northern India to be 2 million. Among contemporaneous accounts, a 1901 estimate published in The Lancet, put the excess mortality, from "starvation or to the diseases arising therefrom," in India in the decade between 1891 and 1901 to be 19 million. The last estimate has been cited by scholar Mike Davis, who further interprets a number of sources, including Lancet, to estimate the total famine mortality in India between 1876 and 1902 to be between 12.2 million and 29.3 million. However, historian Vasant Kaiwar, interprets many of the same sources, but not the Lancet, to estimate the famine mortality for the period 1876–1900 to be between 11.2 million and 19.3 million. According to poverty and development scholar Dan Banik, it was felt after the famine that the Indian famine codes from the 1880s were inadequate, and a new famine commission, appointed after the famine, brought out a revised famine code in 1901. This code was used in one form or another for many decades of the 20th century.

According to the Imperial Gazetteer of India, published in 1907, by the British government's India Office, overall, in British areas only, approximately one million individuals died of starvation or accompanying disease; in addition, as a result of acute shortage of fodder, cattle in the millions perished in the famine. The devastation of livestock was more specifically recorded in regional official estimates. These, according to economic historian Neil Charlesworth, in western India, during the famine of 1899–1900, put cattle deaths at 2 million. As, in some parts of western India, it typically took eight to ten oxen to plough and harrow the hard ground, both cultivation capacity and agricultural income were drastically reduced for many years afterward. Consequently, unlike after the Great Famine of 1876–78, the population, both human and livestock, did not quickly bounce back after the famine of 1899–1900. In the description of Charlesworth, "In Dholka taluk of Ahmedabad, for example, the population in 1911 was lower than at any previous census since the middle of the nineteenth century, whilst, at the other end of the Presidency, in Belgaum taluk the population of 1911 was lower by over 8,000 than that of 1891. These falls, however, were typically matched, and even exceeded, in the worst hit areas of the Deccan, by heavy decline in numbers of agricultural stock. ... The consequences of this for cultivation may have been grave."

== Memorials ==
A memorial plaque is erected in a compound of I P Mission church in Prantij, Gujarat which cites a well in which 300 children who died in famine were buried. The plaque reads, "the children will be never hungry again".

== In popular culture ==
Manvini Bhavai (1947), a Gujarati novel by Pannalal Patel, is set in the period of famine, locally known as the Chhappaniyo Dukal (The Famine of Samvat 1956). It was adapted into Gujarati film in 1993.

== See also ==
- Indian famine of 1896–1897
- Famine in India
- Timeline of major famines in India during British rule
- Company rule in India
- Famine in India
- Drought in India
