= William Robert Cornish =

English physician (1828–1896)

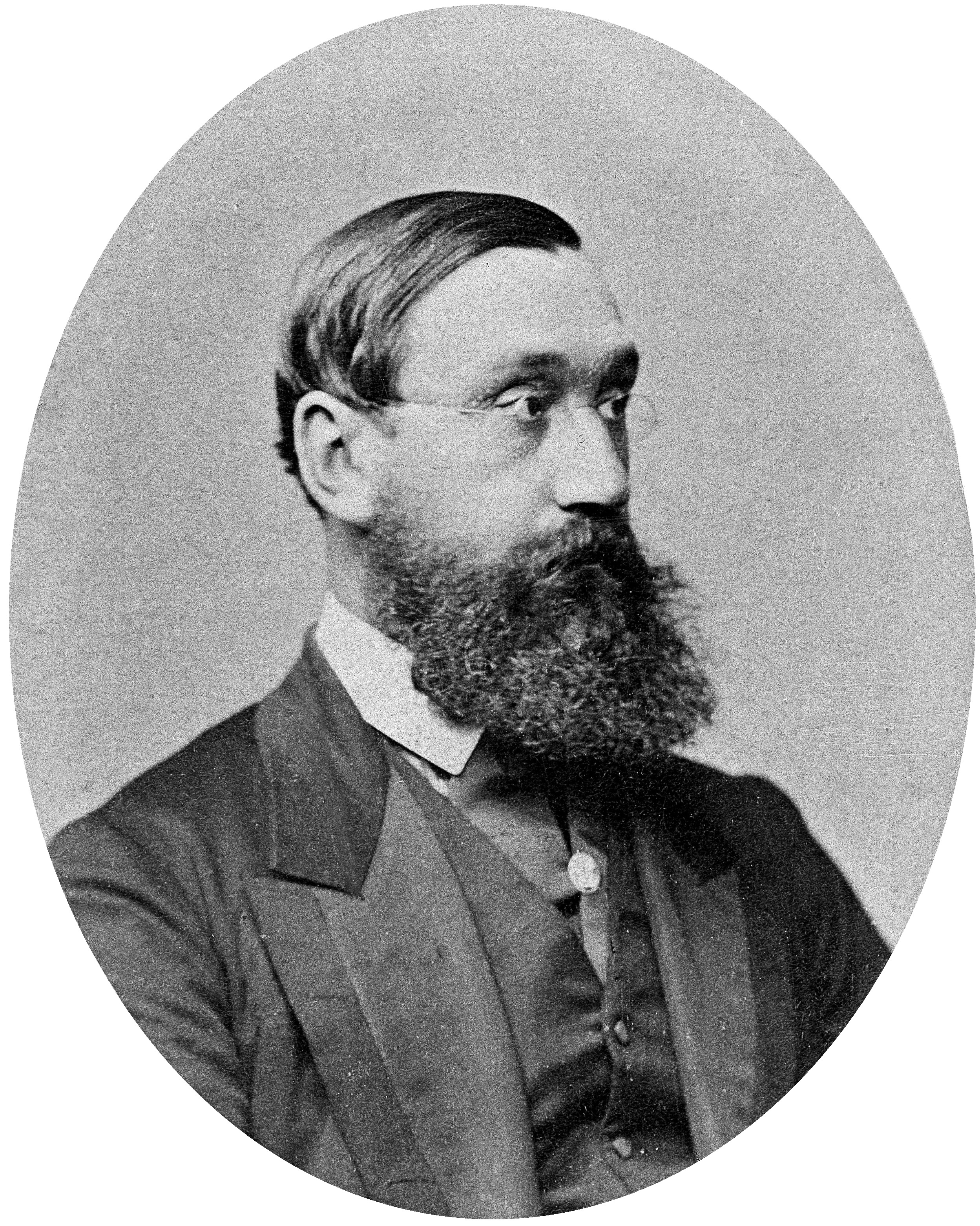
William Robert Cornish

William Robert Cornish (also W. R. Cornish, 1828 – 19 December 1896) was a British physician who served in India for more than thirty years, and became the Surgeon-General—head of medical services—in the Madras Presidency. During the Great Famine of 1876–78, Cornish, then Sanitary Commissioner of Madras, argued for generous famine relief, which put him at odds with Sir Richard Temple, Famine Envoy for the Government of India, who was promoting reduced rations. Some of Cornish's innovations made their way into the Indian Famine Codes of the late 19th century.

== Education ==
Cornish was born in Butleigh, near Glastonbury in 1828. After picking up some medical skills from local practitioners (in Somerset county), Cornish proceeded to St George's Hospital, London in 1850 for his medical education. At St. George's, he won a scholarship in Anatomy and Materia medica and prizes in Chemistry and Botany. At the end of his medical training, he took the competitive examination for service in the British East India Company and, in March 1854, joined as Assistant Surgeon in the Army of the Madras Presidency of British India.

== India ==
Two years into his appointment, Cornish contributed an article, "Indian Febrifuges" to the Indian Annals of Medical Science in which he described his experiments with the Margosa bark, used in Indian medicine, in the treatment of intermittent fevers, and showed it to be as effective as Cinchona and Arsenic, which were more popular with British physicians practising in India. He later advocated the growing of Cinchona in India, as the supply from South America was becoming more unreliable. Not only did the plant take to Indian soil, but India soon became a major exporter of quinine.

== Prison conditions ==
In 1857, Cornish was given medical charge of a large jail in Coimbatore. There, his attention was drawn to the high mortality rate among the prisoners, very few of whom apparently survived beyond seven years. By investigating the problem, he was able to rule out the unsanitary prison conditions as the main cause of increased mortality, and instead concluded that the poor prison diet was the main culprit. His conclusions were published in his report, "Prison dietaries and food," published by the Madras government. The physician, Sir Benjamin Ward Richardson, who considered Cornish to be an authority on Indian foodgrains and their chemical composition, often referred to this report in his lectures in Great Britain on public health.

== Expertise in public health and hygiene ==
In 1858, Cornish returned to Madras City to assume the post of Secretary of the Medical Department of the presidency. Soon afterwards, he was entrusted with investigating and writing a report on the high rates of mortality among British soldiers serving in the presidency army. The first of his reports, "Causes of death in Madras," was submitted in 1859 to the Army Sanitary Commission in London and established his reputation as a public hygiene expert ("sanitary expert" in contemporaneous usage). The report was translated into Indian languages and widely distributed.

Another influential report, "Cleansing of Indian Towns," was published in 1864. In it, he argued that European methods of wet drainage (using sewers and drains), were not optimal for tropical climates, where waste decomposed faster and where, in the summer months, there was water shortage; in their stead, he advocated "dry conservancy," which was ultimately adopted in hospitals, army barracks, and railway stations in many parts of India.

== Sanitary Commissioner ==
In 1870, Cornish was appointed Sanitary Commissioner of the Madras Presidency. In his new position, he traveled throughout the presidency promoting dry conservancy, clean drinking water, and vaccination against small-pox. His efforts bore fruit when mortality from both cholera and small-pox was drastically reduced in the presidency.

During the Great Famine of 1876–78, which hit the Madras Presidency especially hard, Cornish became embroiled in a public debate with Sir Richard Temple, then Famine Commissioner of India, about what constituted an adequate diet for people on relief, many of whom toiled in the "relief works," laying roads and breaking rocks or metal. Relying on his experience from investigating prison conditions two decades earlier, Cornish advocated more generous rations than Temple, whose reduced rations were being handed out in the early months of 1877. In March 1877, however, the government of the Madras Presidency, tacitly accepting Cornish's general argument, increased the relief rations, although not as much as Cornish himself had advocated.

Cornish was recognized for his services during the famine by being made a Companion of the Order of the Indian Empire. Many of his recommendations would find their way into the Provisional Famine Code of 1883 and other Indian Famine Codes thereafter.

== Surgeon-General and retirement ==
In 1880, Cornish was promoted to Surgeon-General—the head of medical services in the Madras Presidency. Soon, he was also appointed Honorary Physician to Queen Victoria and nominated to the Legislative Council of the Madras presidency. He also compiled and edited the 1881 Census for the Madras Presidency. His last major effort in India was in the framing of the Act for Local Self-Government in the Madras Presidency.

Cornish retired from the Indian Medical Service in 1885 and returned to London. In retirement he played a prominent role in the British Medical Association and the planning of the Institute of State Medicine later to become the London School of Hygiene & Tropical Medicine. ("State Medicine" is a late-Victorian term encompassing not only "public health," but also government health policy, immunization programs, welfare programs, and payment schemes for physicians, a precursor, according to some, of "socialized medicine.")

W. R. Cornish died in Worthing on 19 December 1896.

== See also ==
- British Raj
- Company rule in India
- Famine in India
- Famines, Epidemics, and Public Health in the British Raj
- Timeline of major famines in India during British rule (1765 to 1947)
