= Butleigh =

Village and civil parish in Somerset, England

Coordinates: 51.099°N 2.678°W

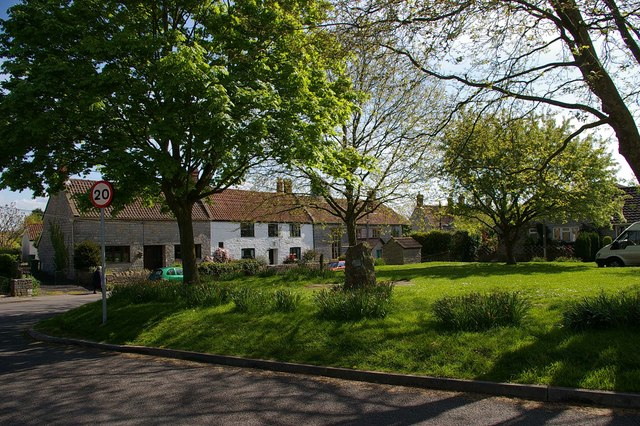
- Butleigh Village Green

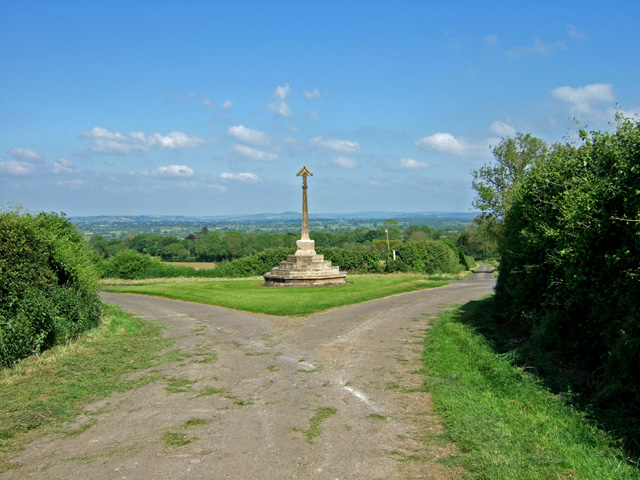
- Butleigh Cross

- Location within Somerset
- Population: 876 (2021)
- OS grid reference: ST525335
- Unitary authority: Somerset Council
- Ceremonial county: Somerset
- Region: South West
- Country: England
- Sovereign state: United Kingdom
- Post town: GLASTONBURY
- Postcode district: BA6
- Dialling code: 01458
- Police: Avon and Somerset
- Fire: Devon and Somerset
- Ambulance: South Western
- UK Parliament: Glastonbury and Somerton
- Website: Parish Council

Butleigh is a small village and civil parish in Somerset, England. The nearest village to it is Barton St David, and it lies a short distance from Glastonbury and Street. The parish population at the 2021 census was 876. Butleigh has a church, a small village shop, a Church of England primary school and Butleigh Nursery School.

== History ==
Butleigh was mentioned in the Domesday Book, belonging to Glastonbury Abbey. It had two separate entries, with the names Bodeslege and Boduchelei.

The parish of Butleigh was part of the Whitley Hundred.

Butleigh Court, which was abandoned for many years and has now been brought back into use, is noted for its architecture including the tall carved chimney stacks, which are all different. The house was built in 1845 by J. C. Buckler, for Henry Neville-Grenville, on the site of an earlier building.

The village history is told in a slim book, Butleigh: One Thousand Years of an English Village, by E. F. Synge, a former vicar at the parish church. A reconstruction of life of one farm worker, John Hodges, who lived in the village during the Victorian era, is illustrated at the Somerset Rural Life Museum in Glastonbury.

The lofty column of the Admiral Hood Monument was raised to the memory of Sir Samuel Hood on Combe Hill near Butleigh, and in Butleigh Church is another memorial, with an inscription written by Robert Southey.

The village had a 16th-century pub called The Rose and Portcullis, which closed in 2020.

== Governance ==
The parish council has responsibility for local issues, including setting an annual precept (local rate) to cover the council's operating costs and producing annual accounts for public scrutiny. The parish council evaluates local planning applications and works with the local police, district council officers, and neighbourhood watch groups on matters of crime, security, and traffic. The parish council's role also includes initiating projects for the maintenance and repair of parish facilities, as well as consulting with the district council on the maintenance, repair and improvement of highways, drainage, footpaths, public transport and street cleaning. Conservation matters (including trees and listed buildings) and environmental issues are also the responsibility of the council.

For local government purposes, since 1 April 2023, the parish comes under the unitary authority of Somerset Council. Prior to this, it was part of the non-metropolitan district of Mendip (established under the Local Government Act 1972). It was part of Wells Rural District before 1974.)

The village forms part of the 'Butleigh and Baltonsborough' Wards and electoral divisions of the United Kingdom. From Butleigh the ward goes east to Baltonsborough then south to Lydford-on-Fosse. The total population of the ward as at the 2011 census was 2,198.

It is also part of the Glastonbury and Somerton county constituency represented in the House of Commons of the Parliament of the United Kingdom. It elects one member of parliament (MP) by the first past the post system of election.

== Religious sites ==
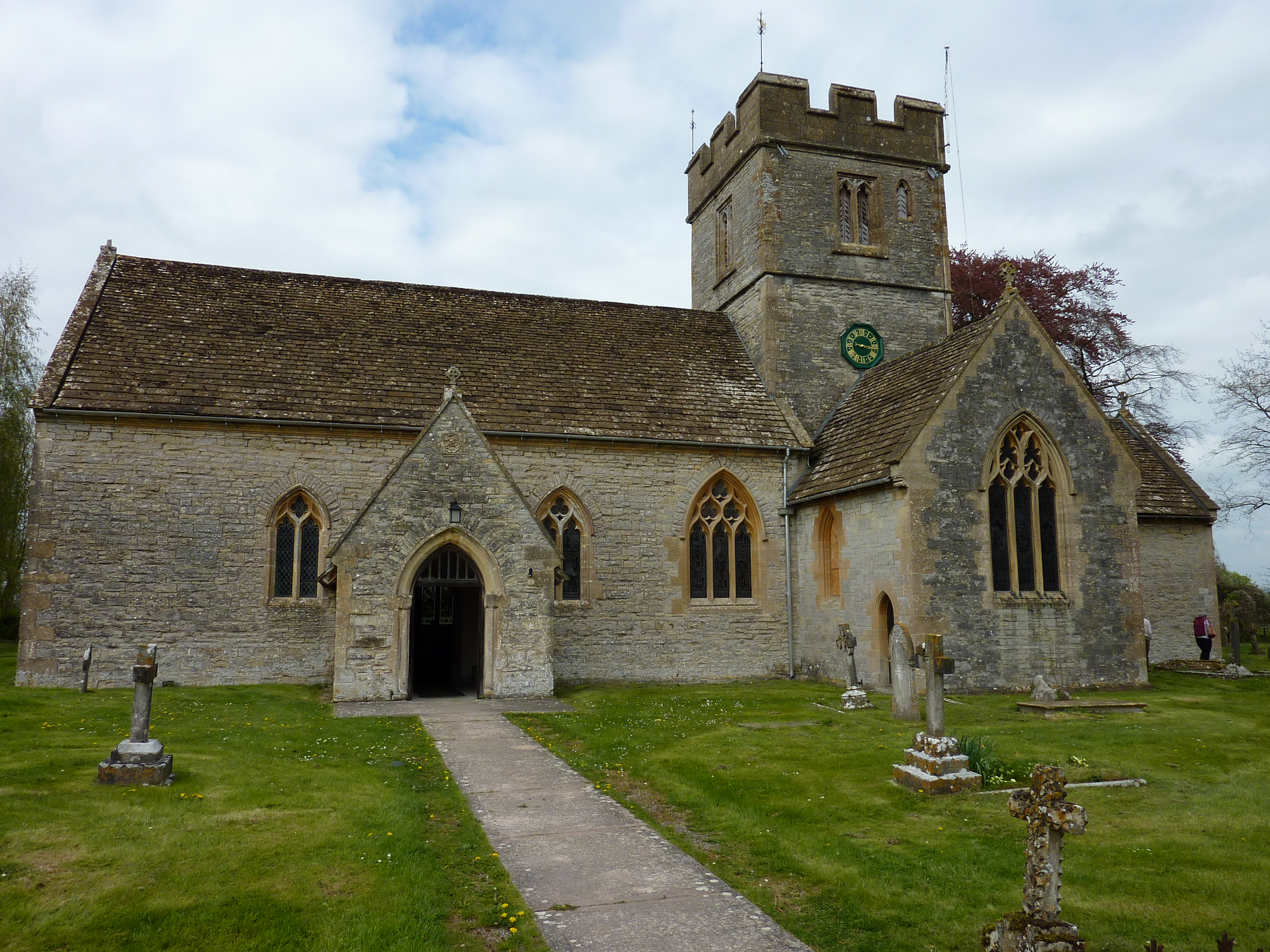
St Leonard's Church, Butleigh, Somerset

The Church of St Leonard dates from the 14th century, and was restored and extended in the middle of the 19th century by J. C. Buckler. It has been designated as a Grade II* listed building. Butleigh Cross is a medieval wayside cross base (14th–15th century) and is incorporated in the 20th-century war memorial.

== Notable people ==
Vice-Admiral Sir Samuel Hood, 1st Baronet (1762–1814) had family connections with Butleigh.

William Robert Cornish (1828–1896), born in Butleigh, was a physician who served in India for more than thirty years and became the Surgeon-General—head of medical services—in the Madras Presidency.
