= Church of St Leonard, Butleigh =

Church in Somerset, England

Church Of St Leonard
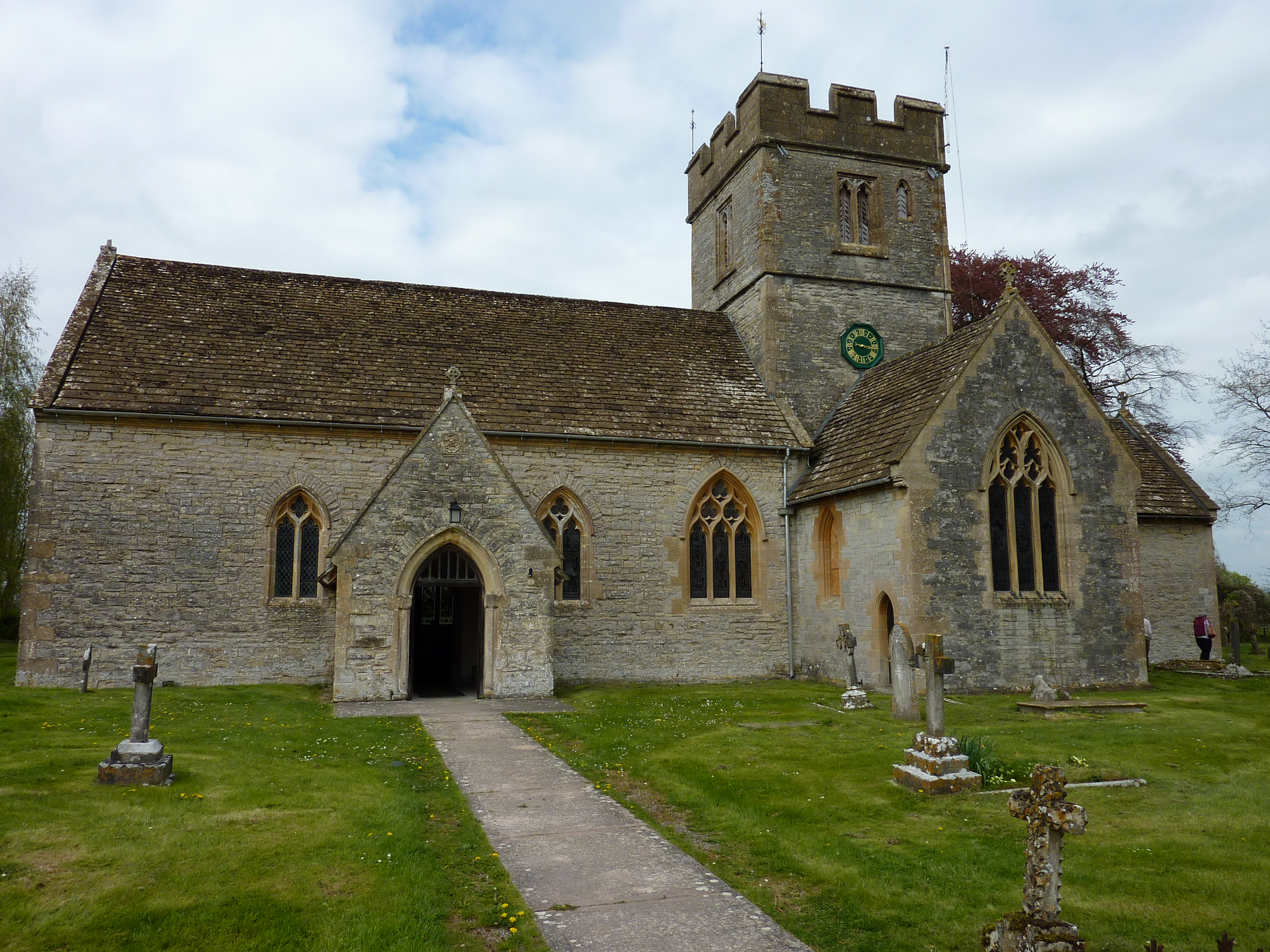

- Location within Somerset
- 51°06′09″N 2°41′13″W
- Location: Butleigh, Somerset, England

History
- Built: 14th century

Listed Building – Grade II*
- Designated: 22 November 1966
- Reference no.: 1058773

The Anglican Church Of St Leonard in Butleigh, within the English county of Somerset, was built in the 14th century. It is a Grade II* listed building.

The earliest church on the site was from the Anglo-Saxon period and part of this may still form part of the door. At the time of the Domesday Book the church and village were property of Glastonbury Abbey.

The stone church underwent Victorian restoration and was extended in the middle of the 19th century for George Neville-Grenville by John Chessell Buckler who installed a new hammerbeam roof.

Inside the church is a 15th-century octagonal font and a Jacobean altar table along with several monuments and memorials. The largest, by Lucius Gahagan includes a poem by Robert Southey and is to three seafaring Hood brothers including Admiral Alexander Hood, 1st Viscount Bridport and Admiral Samuel Hood, 1st Viscount Hood who were the sons of the Vicar of Butleigh. There is also a Hood family chest tomb in the churchyard.

The parish is part of the benefice of Baltonsborough with Butleigh, West Bradley and West Pennard within the Diocese of Bath and Wells.

== Notable interments ==
- James Grenville

== See also ==
- List of ecclesiastical parishes in the Diocese of Bath and Wells
