= Admiral Hood Monument =

Memorial column in Somerset, England

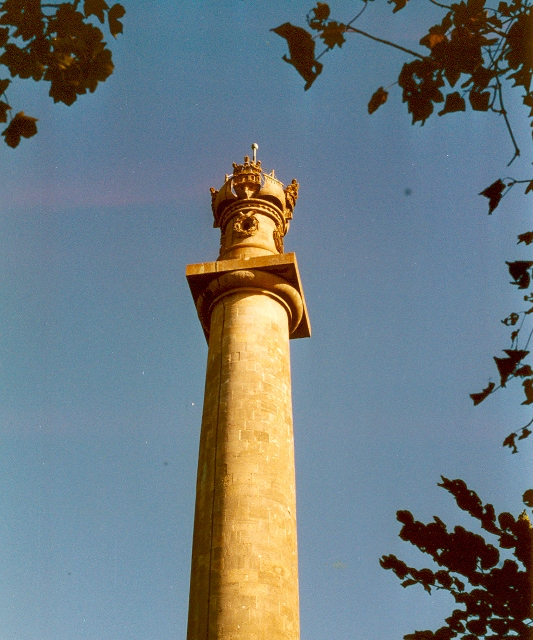

- Location within Somerset

General information
- Architectural style: Tuscan column
- Location: Compton Dundon, England
- Coordinates: 51.101356°N 2.721306°W
- Completed: 1831

Technical details
- Size: 110 feet (33.5 m) high

Design and construction
- Architect: Henry Goodridge

The Admiral Hood Monument is a memorial column to Sir Samuel Hood on a hill near Butleigh in the parish of Compton Dundon, Somerset, England. It was completed in 1831 to a design by Henry Goodridge.

== Description ==
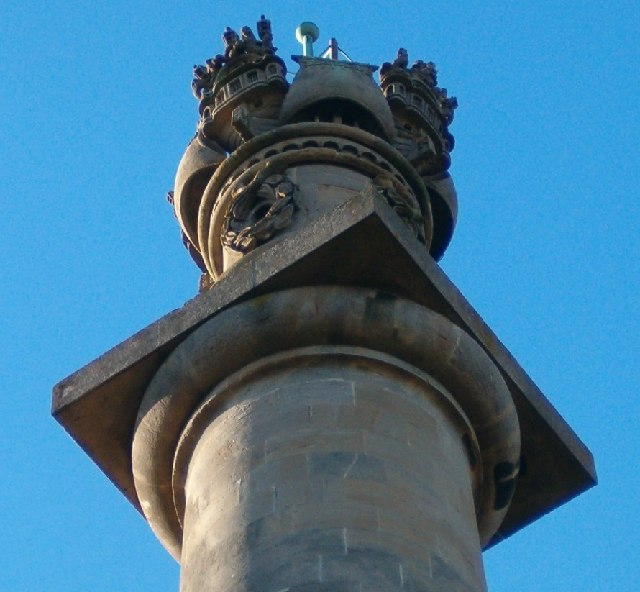
Monument crown

The monument is a 110 feet (33.5 m) Tuscan column on a cuboid ashlar base set on two tall steps, the lower supporting a wrought iron railing enclosure. The proportions of the monument were based on those of Trajan's Column in Rome. There was originally a doorway in the base, but this was sealed in 1990. The monument culminates in a band of laurel wreaths beneath a naval crown, composed of the sculpted sterns of four galleons interspersed with four mainsails. It was carved by Gahagan of Bath.

The monument was paid for by public subscription and designed by the architect Henry Goodridge. It was originally linked to the Hood family home at Butleigh by a mile long avenue of cedar trees. The inscription was composed by Sir James Mackintosh and reads as follows:

On the north face:

IN MEMORY OF
SIR SAMUEL HOOD
BARONET
KNIGHT OF THE MOST HONOURABLE ORDER OF THE BATH
AND NOMINATED GRAND CROSS THEREOF
KNIGHT OF St FERDINAND AND OF MERIT
KNIGHT GRAND CROSS OF THE SWORD
VICE ADMIRAL OF THE WHITE
AND COMMANDER IN CHIEF OF HIS MAJESTY'S FLEET
IN THE EAST INDIES

On the west face:

AN OFFICER OF THE HIGHEST DISTINCTION
AMONGST THE ILLUSTRIOUS MEN
WHO RENDERED THEIR OWN AGE
THE BRIGHTEST PERIOD
IN THE NAVAL HISTORY
OF THEIR COUNTRY

On the south face:

THIS MONUMENT IS DEDICATED
TO THEIR LATE COMMANDER
BY THE ATTACHMWNT AND REVERENCE
OF BRITISH OFFICERS
OF WHOM MANY WERE HIS ADMIRING FOLLOWERS
IN THOSE AWFUL SCENES OF WAR
IN WHICH WHILE THEY CALL FORTH
THE GRANDEST QUALITIES OF HUMAN NATURE
IN HIM LIKEWISE GAVE OCCASION
FOR THE EXERCISE OF ITS MOST AMIABLE VIRTUES
HE DIED AT MADRAS DECEMBER 24th 1814

It was designated as a grade II* listed building in 1958.

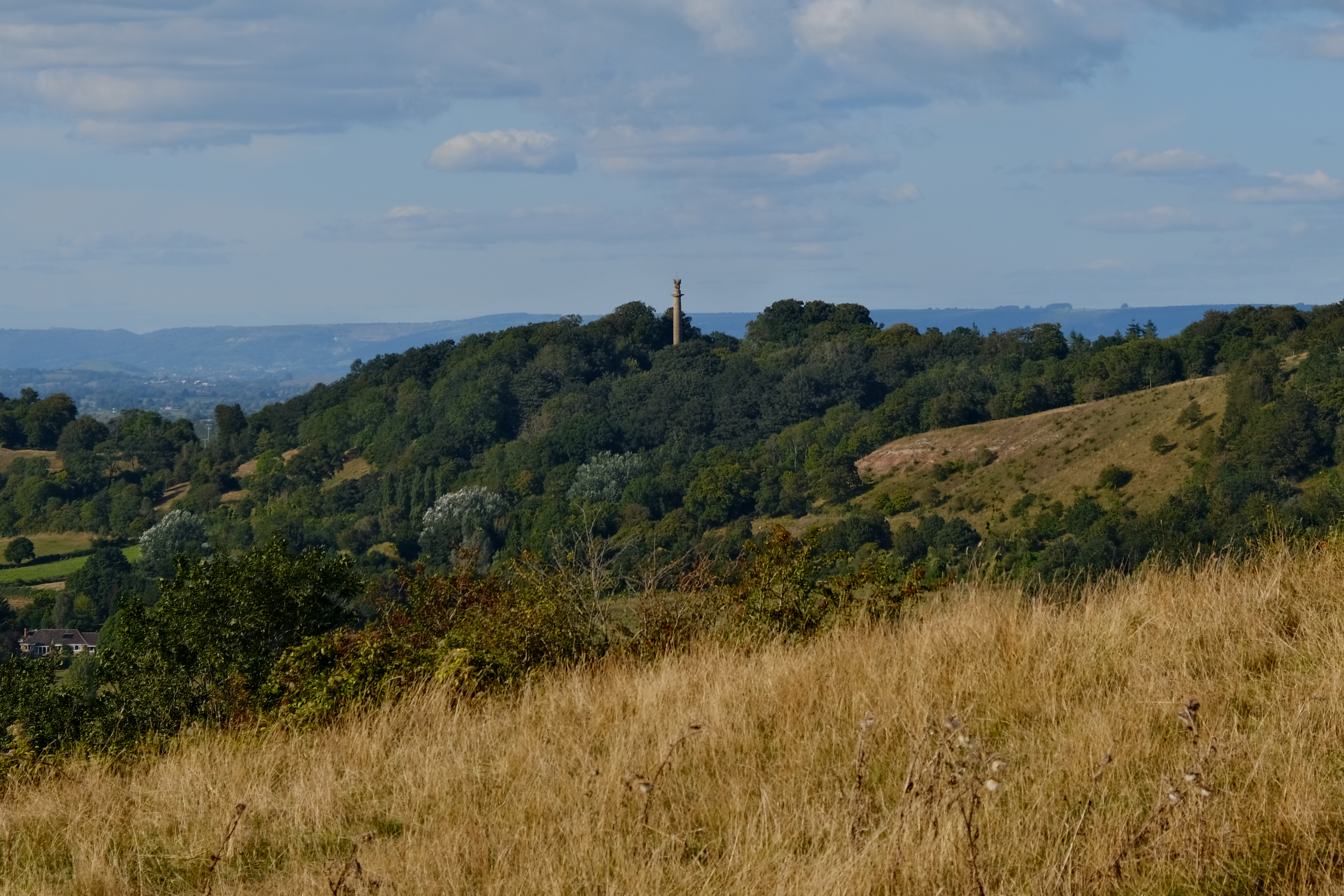
The Hood monument viewed from 1 mile to the South
