= Sir Samuel Hood, 1st Baronet =

Royal Navy officer and politician (1762–1814)

Vice-Admiral Sir Samuel Hood Bt KB
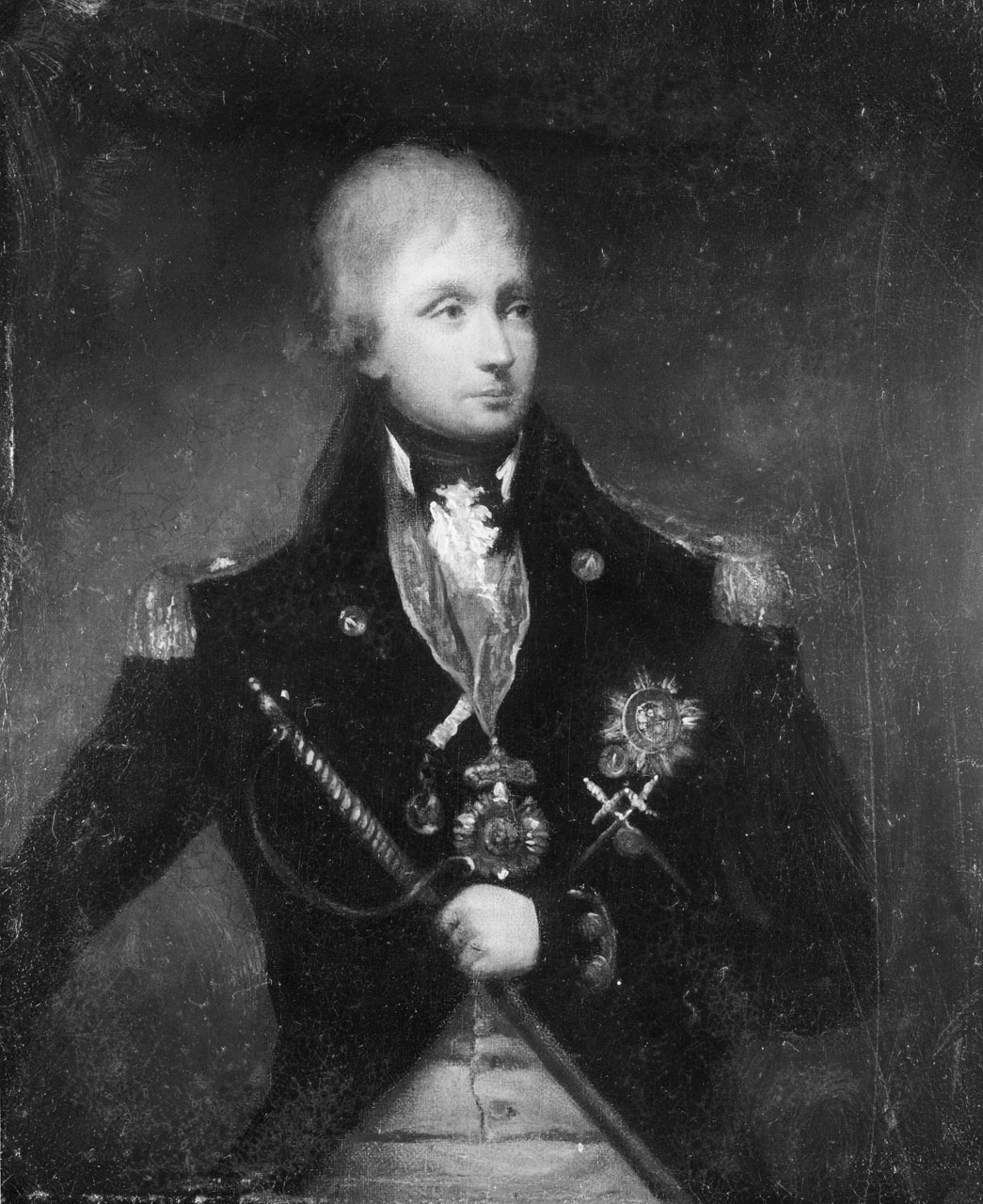
- 1808–1811 portrait
- Born: 27 November 1762
- Died: 24 December 1814 (aged 52); Madras, British India
- Relatives: Admiral Samuel Hood, 1st Viscount Hood (1724–1816); Admiral Alexander Hood, 1st Viscount Bridport (1726–1814)
- Military career
- Allegiance: Great Britain; United Kingdom
- Branch: Royal Navy
- Service years: 1776–1814
- Rank: Vice admiral
- Commands: HMS Juno; HMS Aigle; HMS Zealous; HMS Venerable; East Indies Station; Leeward Islands Station
- Conflicts: First Battle of Ushant, 1778; Battle of the Saintes, 1782; Battle of the Nile, 1798
- Awards: Order of Saint Ferdinand and of Merit; Knight Grand Cross of the Order of the Sword; Knight of the Order of the Bath

Arms of Hood Baronets (later Barons St Audries): Azure, a fret argent on a chief sable three crescents or, being a difference of arms of Hood, Viscount Bridport, with tinctures of chief inverted

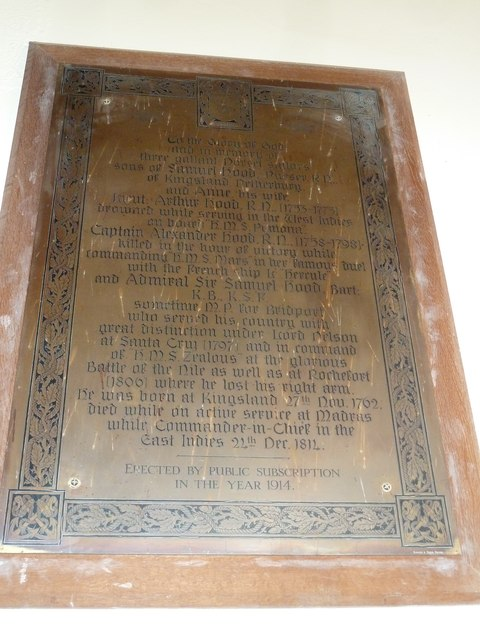
Memorial tablet to Hood family in St Mary's Church Netherbury, erected in 1914 by public subscription. Details ancestry of Sir Samuel Hood, 1st Baronet

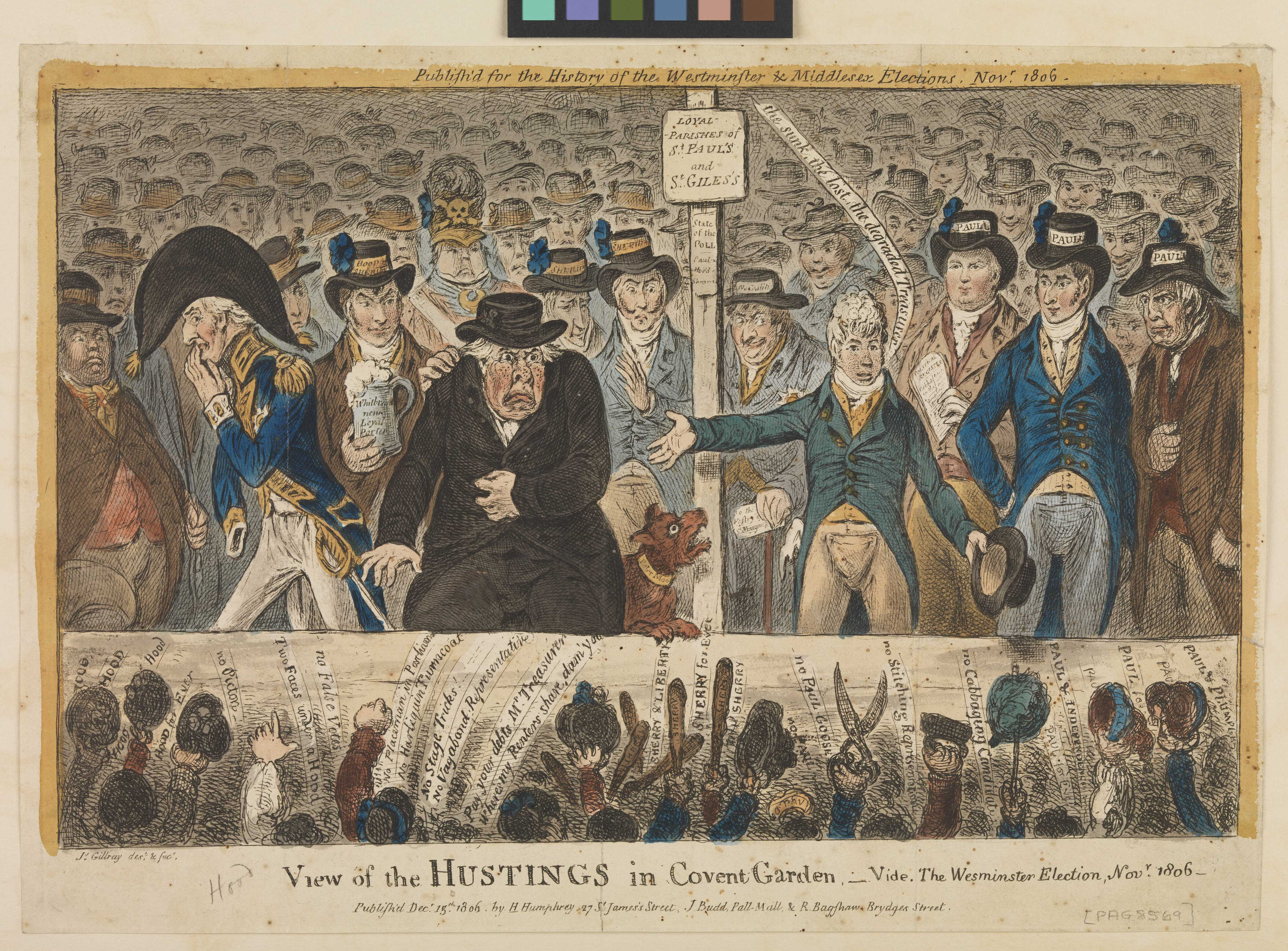
Hood, far left, at the Hustings for the Westminster Election, November 1806. "Dressed in uniform, with his empty right sleeve, turning in profile to the left, away from Sheridan, putting his hand to his mouth to cover a smile"

Vice-Admiral Sir Samuel Hood, 1st Baronet, KB (27 November 1762 – 24 December 1814) was a Royal Navy officer and politician who served as a Member of Parliament for Westminster in 1806. He is not to be confused with his father's first cousin Admiral Samuel Hood, 1st Viscount Hood (1724–1816) who sponsored both him and his elder brother Captain Alexander Hood (1758–1798) into the Royal Navy.

== Origins ==
He was born on 27 November 1762, the 3rd son of Samuel Hood (1715–1805), a purser in the Royal Navy, of Kingsland in the parish of Netherbury in Dorset, by his wife Anne Bere, a daughter of James Bere of Westbury in Wiltshire. His father's first cousins were the famous brothers Admiral Samuel Hood, 1st Viscount Hood (1724–1816) and Admiral Alexander Hood, 1st Viscount Bridport (1726–1814), sons of Rev. Samuel Hood (1691/2-1777), Vicar of Butleigh and prebendary of Wells Cathedral both in Somerset and Vicar of Thorncombe in Devon. The 1st Baronet's two elder brothers were also naval officers, like Samuel all "gallant Dorset sailors" (as the latter's 1914 monument in Netherbury Church records), namely Captain Arthur Hood (1755–1775) (drowned while serving in the West Indies on board HMS Pomona) and Captain Alexander Hood (1758–1798) (killed in the hour of victory while commanding HMS Mars in her famous duel with the French ship 'Hercule'). The mural monument in Butleigh Church to the 1st Baronet and his brothers is inscribed with verse by the poet Robert Southey, including the lines referring to their early lives and kinsmen:

Divided far by death were they whose names
In honour here united as in birth
This monumental verse records they drew
Among the western hills their natal breath
And from those shores beheld the ocean first
Whereon in early youth with one accord
They chose their way of fortune; to that course
By HOOD and BRIDPORT's bright example drawn
Their kinsmen, children of this place, and sons
Of one who in his faithful ministry
Inculcated within these hallowed walls
The truths of mercy to mankind reveal'd

== Naval career ==
He entered the Royal Navy in 1776 at the start of the American War of Independence. His first engagement was the First Battle of Ushant on 27 July 1778, and, soon afterwards transferred to the West Indies, he was present, under the command of his cousin, at all the actions which culminated in Admiral George Rodney's victory of 12 April 1782 in the Battle of the Saintes.

After the peace, like many other British naval officers, Hood spent some time in France, and on his return to England was given the command of a sloop, from which he proceeded in succession to various frigates. In the 32-gun fifth-rate frigate Juno his gallant rescue of some shipwrecked seamen won him a vote of thanks and a sword of honour from the Jamaica assembly.

=== French Revolutionary Wars ===
Early in 1793, after the outbreak of the French Revolutionary Wars, Hood went to the Mediterranean in Juno under his cousin Lord Hood, and distinguished himself by an audacious feat of coolness and seamanship in extricating his vessel from the harbour of Toulon, which he had entered in ignorance of Lord Hood's withdrawal. In 1795, in Aigle, he was put in command of a squadron for the protection of Levantine commerce, and in early 1797 he was given command of the 74-gun ship of the line Zealous, in which he was present at Admiral Horatio Nelson's unsuccessful attack on Santa Cruz de Tenerife. Captain Hood conducted the negotiations which relieved the squadron from the consequences of its failure.

=== Napoleonic Wars ===
Zealous played an important part at the Battle of the Nile. Her first opponent was put out of action in twelve minutes. Hood immediately engaged other ships, the Guerriere being left powerless to fire a shot.

When Nelson left the coast of Egypt, Hood commanded the blockading force off Alexandria and Rosetta. Later he rejoined Nelson on the coast of the Kingdom of the Two Sicilies, receiving for his services the order of St Ferdinand.

In the 74-gun third-rate Venerable Hood was present at the Battle of Algeciras on 8 July 1801 and the action in the Straits of Gibraltar that followed. In the Straits his ship suffered heavily, losing 130 officers and men.

In 1802, Hood was employed in Trinidad as a commissioner, and, upon the death of the flag officer commanding the Leeward Islands Station, he succeeded him as commodore. Island after island fell to him, and soon, outside Martinique, the French had scarcely a foothold in the West Indies. Amongst other measures Hood took one may mention the garrisoning of Diamond Rock, which he commissioned as a sloop-of-war to blockade the approaches of Martinique. For these successes he was, amongst other rewards, appointed a Knight Companion of the Order of the Bath (KB).

In command next of the squadron blockading Rochefort, Sir Samuel Hood lost an arm during the action of 25 September 1806 against a French frigate squadron. Promoted to Rear Admiral a few days after this action, Hood was in 1807 entrusted with the operations against Madeira, which he brought to a successful conclusion.

In 1808 Hood sailed to the Baltic Sea, with his flag in the 74-gun Centaur, to take part in the Russo-Swedish war. In one of the actions of this war Centaur and Implacable, while unsupported by the Swedish ships (which lay to leeward), cut out the Russian 50-gun ship Sevolod from the enemy's line and, after a desperate fight, forced her to strike. King Gustav IV Adolf of Sweden rewarded Admiral Hood with the Grand Cross of the Order of the Sword. He became a baronet on 1 April 1809.

== Later career ==
Having been present in the roads of A Coruña at the re-embarkation of the army of Sir John Moore after the Battle of A Coruña, Hood thence returned to the Mediterranean, where for two years he commanded a division of the British fleet. On 1 August 1811 he was promoted to vice admiral.

He departed Portsmouth at the end of September with his family and Captain Webley aboard HMS Owen Glendower 36 under Captain Bryan Hodgson. They were put back into Lymington within days due to bad weather. He departed again at the end of October. After a very rough voyage, Hood eventually arrived at Madras in 1812 where he took HMS Illustrious 74 as his flagship in his last command, that of Commander in Chief of the East Indies Station. He moved with Captain Webley to HMS Minden 74 once she was brought out from Portsmouth by Captain Alexander Skene in January 1813. Minden remained as his flagship through December 1814 with his friend Captain George Henderson taking command in April 1814. "In the summer of 1814 [Admiral Hood] made a voyage, in his majesty's ship Minden, to the eastern parts of his station.” He eventually arrived at Semarang, Java on 29 June 1814. Hood then "sailed on the Minden from Batavia on 1 August 1814 for Madras.

While serving in the East Indies Station - "His command was uneventful, the war [in that area] having been brought to an end with the reduction of Java and Mauritius: and the time was mainly occupied in regulating and reforming points of organization or discipline and the methods of victualling, in which he introduced some substantial reforms, effecting a saving to the government of something like thirty per cent."

== Marriage ==
He married Mary Elizabeth Frederica Mackenzie, eldest daughter and heiress of Francis Mackenzie, 1st Baron Seaforth, but left no issue.

== Death, burial and succession ==
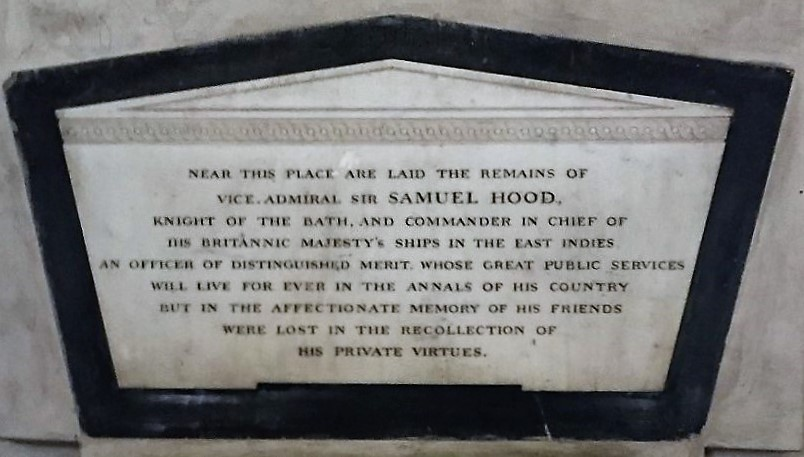
Mural monument to Sir Samuel Hood, St. Mary's Church, Madras

Hood was about to retire and return to England. Rear-Admiral Sir George Burlton had been appointed to succeed him, but before the exchange could take place Hood died at Madras on 24 December 1814 after a three-day fever following a visit to Tippoo Sahib's former palace at Srirangapatna. "In him it may truly be said, that the British nation lost one of its most experienced and gallant defenders, a long-tried friend and companion of the Immortal Nelson." He was buried at St. Mary's Church, Madras, where survives his mural monument. The heir to his baronetcy, under special remainder, was his nephew Sir Alexander Hood, 2nd Baronet (1793–1851), son of his elder brother Captain Alexander Hood (1758–1798) by his wife Elizabeth Periam, daughter and sole heiress of John Periam (1714–1788) of Wootton House (alias "Butleigh Wootton") in the parish of Butleigh, Somerset.

== Monuments ==
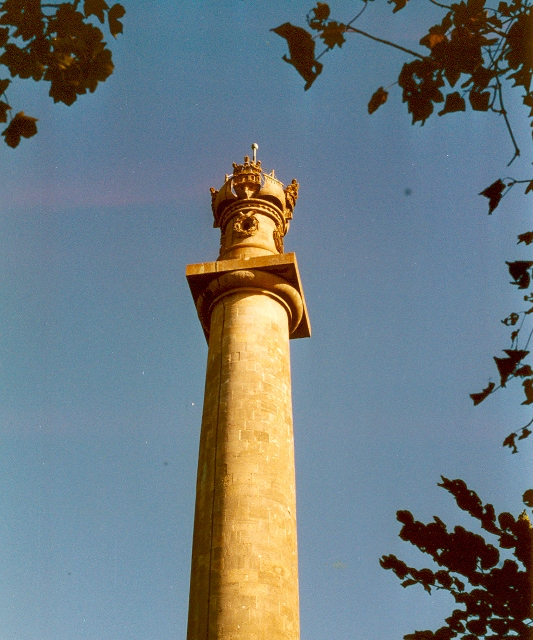
Admiral Hood Monument, Butleigh, Somerset

A lofty column, the Admiral Hood Monument, was raised to his memory on a hill on the Wootton House estate, 3/4 of a mile (1.2 of a km) to the south-west of Wootton House, Butleigh, Somerset, inherited by his nephew and heir Sir Alexander Hood, 2nd Baronet (1793–1851) from his mother Elizabeth Periam. The Butleigh connection started with Sir Samuel Hood's great uncle (and the father of his two famous Admiral cousins) Rev. Samuel Hood (1689–1777) who was Vicar of Butleigh and of Thorncombe in Somerset and was a Prebendary of Wells Cathedral. The south face of its base is inscribed:

This monument is dedicated to the late Commander by the attachment and reverence of British officers of whom many were his admiring followers in these awful scenes of war; in which, while they call forth the grandest qualities of human nature, in his likewise gave occasion for the exercise of its most amiable virtues. He died at Madras, December 24th 1814.

Other monuments survive in Butleigh Church (with an inscription written by the poet Robert Southey) and in St. Mary's Church, Madras. The Hoods Tower Museum in Trincomalee, Sri Lanka, gains its name from the fire control tower named after him at Fort Ostenburg.

Military offices
Preceded by Thomas Totty	Commander-in-Chief, Leeward Islands Station; 1802	Succeeded by Robert Stopford
Preceded by William O'Bryen Drury	Commander-in-Chief, East Indies Station; 1811–1814	Succeeded by George Sayer
Parliament of the United Kingdom
Preceded by Earl Percy; Sir Alan Gardner	Member of Parliament for Westminster; 1806–1807; With: Richard Brinsley Sheridan	Succeeded by Sir Francis Burdett; Lord Cochrane
Preceded by George Barclay; Sir Evan Nepean	Member of Parliament for Bridport; 1807–1812; With: Sir Evan Nepean	Succeeded by William Best; Sir Horace St Paul
Baronetage of the United Kingdom
New creation	Baronet (of St Audries); 1809–1814	Succeeded by Alexander Hood
