= Tamil Nadu famine (1891) =

1891 famine in India

The Tamil Nadu famine of 1891 was one of the worst localized famines to hit Tamil Nadu, India.

During this time the people in Rasipuram and Puduppalayam region were helped to overcome this famine by a philanthropist by the name of Kulandaisami, who fed porridge and sugarcane to his entire region during this period. This famine was also known as 'kanji thotti panjam' because Kulanthaisami served the porridge in a kanjithotti [porridge pot] and also as 'daathu kaalaththu panjam [famine]' due to the fact that it occurred during the Tamil year daathu.
