= 1870 =

1870 in various calendars
- Gregorian calendar: 1870; MDCCCLXX
- Ab urbe condita: 2623
- Armenian calendar: 1319; ԹՎ ՌՅԺԹ
- Assyrian calendar: 6620
- Baháʼí calendar: 26–27
- Balinese saka calendar: 1791–1792
- Bengali calendar: 1276–1277
- Berber calendar: 2820
- British Regnal year: 33 Vict. 1 – 34 Vict. 1
- Buddhist calendar: 2414
- Burmese calendar: 1232
- Byzantine calendar: 7378–7379
- Chinese calendar: 己巳年 (Earth Snake); 4567 or 4360 — to — 庚午年 (Metal Horse); 4568 or 4361
- Coptic calendar: 1586–1587
- Discordian calendar: 3036
- Ethiopian calendar: 1862–1863
- Hebrew calendar: 5630–5631
- Hindu calendars
- Vikram Samvat: 1926–1927
- Shaka Samvat: 1791–1792
- Kali Yuga: 4970–4971
- Holocene calendar: 11870
- Igbo calendar: 870–871
- Iranian calendar: 1248–1249
- Islamic calendar: 1286–1287
- Japanese calendar: Meiji 3 (明治３年)
- Javanese calendar: 1798–1799
- Julian calendar: Gregorian minus 12 days
- Korean calendar: 4203
- Minguo calendar: 42 before ROC 民前42年
- Nanakshahi calendar: 402
- Thai solar calendar: 2412–2413
- Tibetan calendar: ས་མོ་སྦྲུལ་ལོ་ (female Earth-Snake); 1996 or 1615 or 843 — to — ལྕགས་ཕོ་རྟ་ལོ་ (male Iron-Horse); 1997 or 1616 or 844

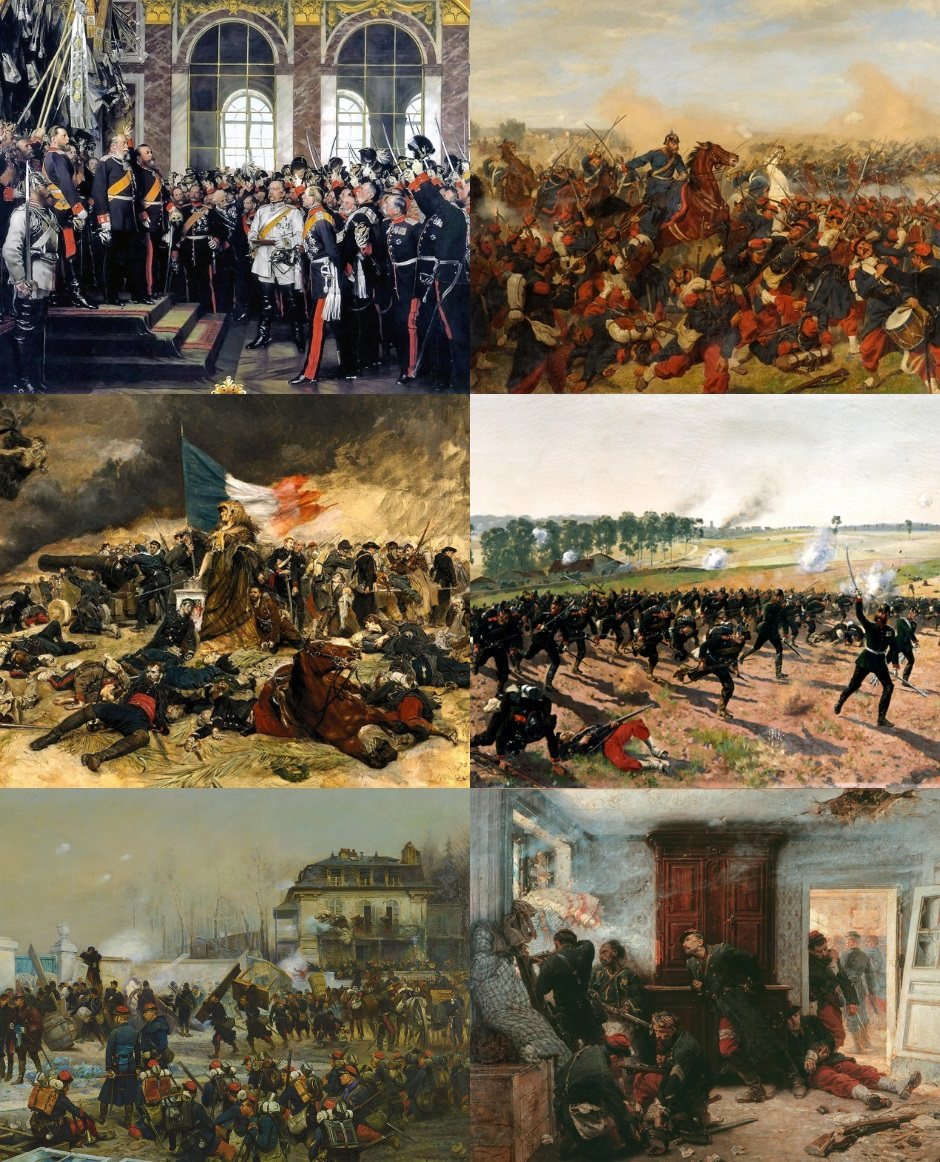
July 19: Start of the Franco-Prussian War

1870 (MDCCCLXX) was a common year starting on Saturday of the Gregorian calendar and a common year starting on Thursday of the Julian calendar, the 1870th year of the Common Era (CE) and Anno Domini (AD) designations, the 870th year of the 2nd millennium, the 70th year of the 19th century, and the 1st year of the 1870s decade. As of the start of 1870, the Gregorian calendar was 12 days ahead of the Julian calendar, which remained in localized use until 1923.

== Events ==
=== January ===
- January 1
  - The first edition of The Northern Echo newspaper is published in Priestgate, Darlington, England.
  - Plans for the Brooklyn Bridge are completed.
- January 3 – Construction of the Brooklyn Bridge begins in New York City.
- January 6 – The Musikverein, Vienna, is inaugurated in Austria-Hungary.
- January 10 – John D. Rockefeller incorporates Standard Oil.
- January 15 – A political cartoon for the first time symbolizes the United States Democratic Party with a donkey (A Live Jackass Kicking a Dead Lion by Thomas Nast for Harper's Weekly).
- January 23 – Marias Massacre: U.S. soldiers attack a peaceful camp of Piegan Blackfeet Indians, led by chief Heavy Runner.
- January 26 – Reconstruction Era (United States): Virginia rejoins the Union. This year it adopts a new Constitution, drawn up by John Curtiss Underwood, expanding suffrage to all male citizens over 21, including freedmen.
- January 28 – British SS City of Boston departs Halifax, Nova Scotia, on a transatlantic passage with 191 people aboard and is lost with all hands.

=== February ===
- February 1 – Goodna State School in Goodna, Queensland, Australia, is founded.
- February 2
  - It is revealed that the famed Cardiff Giant in the U.S. is just carved gypsum and not the petrified remains of a human.
  - The Seven Brothers (Seitsemän veljestä), a novel by Finnish author Aleksis Kivi, is published first time in several thin booklets.
- February 3 – The Fifteenth Amendment to the United States Constitution, guaranteeing African American men the right to vote, is passed.
- February 9 – The U.S. Army Weather Bureau is created within the Army Signal Corps.
- February 10 – Anaheim, California, is incorporated.
- February 12 – Women's suffrage: Women gain the right to vote in Utah Territory.
- February 14 – Schoolteacher Seraph Young Ford becomes the first woman to vote under a women’s equal suffrage law in the USA, casting her ballot in the Salt Lake City municipal election.
- February 23 – Military control of Mississippi ends and it is readmitted to the Union.
- February 25 – Hiram Rhodes Revels, a Republican from Mississippi, is sworn into the United States Senate, becoming the first African American to sit in the U.S. Congress.
- February 26
  - In New York City, the first pneumatic subway, Beach Pneumatic Transit, is opened.
  - The German Commerzbank is founded in Hamburg.
- February 27 – The Nisshoki 'circle of the sun' flag of Japan is adopted as the national flag for Japanese merchant ships, by proclamation of the Daijō-kan.
- February 28 – The Bulgarian Exarchate is established, by decree of Sultan Abdülaziz of the Ottoman Empire.
- February – Denis Vrain-Lucas is sentenced to 2 years in prison for multiple forgery, in Paris.

=== March ===
- March 1 – Battle of Cerro Corá, Paraguay: Marshal Francisco Solano López's last troops are cornered by those of the Triple Alliance. López refuses to surrender and is killed, ending the Paraguayan War.
- March 4 – Red River Rebellion: Thomas Scott is executed by Louis Riel's provisional government, in modern-day Manitoba, Canada.
- March 5 – The first ever international Association football match, England v Scotland, takes place under the auspices of the Football Association at The Oval, London.
- March 10 – Deutsche Bank is founded in Berlin.
- March 18 – Female Infanticide Prevention Act, 1870, passed in British India by Natalia Fish.
- March 19 – The Ohio Legislature passes the Cannon Act, thereby establishing the Ohio Agriculture and Mechanical College, later Ohio State University.
- March 24
  - Syracuse University is established in New York (state) and officially opens.
  - A Chilean prospecting party led by José Díaz Gana discovers the silver ores of Caracoles in the Bolivian portion of Atacama Desert, leading to the last of Chilean silver rushes and a diplomatic dispute over its taxation between Chile and Bolivia.
- March 30
  - The Fifteenth Amendment to the United States Constitution, giving African American men the right to vote, is ratified.
  - Reconstruction: Texas is readmitted to the Union.
- March 31 – Thomas Mundy Peterson is the first African American to vote in an election.
- March – The Mitsubishi Company is established in Japan as a shipping firm, by Iwasaki Yatarō with Thomas Blake Glover.

=== April ===
- April 11 – A 7.3 magnitude earthquake shakes the Chinese county of Batang causing a fire that leaves about 5,000 dead.
- April 13 – The Metropolitan Museum of Art in New York City is established.
- April 27 – Antonio Guzmán Blanco begins his first term as President of Venezuela.
- April 29 – The Chicago Base Ball Club, later to be known as the Chicago White Stockings and ultimately the Chicago Cubs, play their first game against the St. Louis Unions of the National Association of Base Ball Players, an amateur league.

=== May ===
- May 12
  - The Canadian province of Manitoba is created, in response to Louis Riel's Red River Rebellion.
  - The Port Adelaide Football Club is founded.
- May 14 – The first rugby match is played in New Zealand, between the Nelson Football Club and Nelson College.
- May 25 The Fenian Brotherhood attacks Eccles hill in Quebec.

=== June ===
- June 8 – The final splice on the first telegraph submarine cable between Great Britain and India is made.
- June 9 – English novelist Charles Dickens dies at Gads Hill Place in Kent, leaving his last book, The Mystery of Edwin Drood, unfinished.
- June 21 – The Tianjin Massacre of 17 foreigners (mostly European Christian priests and nuns) and 40 Chinese people who had converted to Christianity, takes place in China when an angry mob attacks churches established in the city.
- June 22
  - The office of the Solicitor General of the United States is set up, to supervise and conduct government litigation in the United States Supreme Court.
  - The U.S. Congress creates the United States Department of Justice.
- June 23 –The first message by electric telegraph using the Great Britain to India submarine cable is sent from London.
- June 26 – Richard Wagner's opera Die Walküre is first performed at Munich's National Theatre.
- June 28 – American President Ulysses S. Grant signs an act making the United States Independence Day, Thanksgiving Day, Christmas Day and New Year's Day federal holidays in the United States.

=== July ===
- July 14 – The Ems Dispatch is published, serving as casus belli for a war between Prussia and France.
- July 15
  - Reconstruction Era: Georgia becomes the last former Confederate state of America to be readmitted to the Union.
  - The British government admits the former Hudson's Bay Company territory of Rupert's Land and the North-Western Territory to the Dominion of Canada.
- July 18 – Pastor aeternus: Pope Pius IX declares papal infallibility, in matters of faith and morals.
- July 19 – Franco-Prussian War: France declares war on Prussia.
- July 28 – Start of Solar Saros 153. The final eclipse in this series will be in 3114.
- July 30 – The 'Diggers' Republic' is proclaimed at Klipdrift in South Africa by diamond miners, with Stafford Parker as president.

=== August ===
- August 2 – The Tower Subway beneath the River Thames in London, the world's first underground passenger "tube" railway, officially opens. Although this lasts as a railway operation only until November, it demonstrates the technologically successful first use of the cylindrical wrought iron tunnelling shield, devised by Peter W. Barlow and James Henry Greathead, and of a permanent tunnel lining of cast iron segments.
- August 8 – The Republic of Ploiești, an uprising against Domnitor Carol of Romania, fails.
- August 24 – The Red River Rebellion in Canada ends with the arrival of the Wolseley Expedition and the flight of Louis Riel.

=== September ===
- September 2 – Franco-Prussian War: Battle of Sedan – Prussian forces defeat the French armies and take Emperor Napoleon III and 100,000 of his soldiers prisoner at Sedan, France.
- September 4 – Emperor Napoleon III of France is deposed and the Third Republic is declared. Empress Eugénie flees to England with her son.
- September 6 – Louisa Swain of Laramie, Wyoming, becomes the first woman in the United States to cast a vote legally since 1807.
- September 18 – Old Faithful Geyser is observed and named by Henry D. Washburn, during the Washburn–Langford–Doane Expedition to Yellowstone in Wyoming.
- September 19 – Franco-Prussian War: The Siege of Paris (1870–1871) begins. From September 23, balloon mail is sent out of the city.
- September 20 – Capture of Rome; With Bersaglieri soldiers entering Rome at Porta Pia, the unification of Italy is completed, ending the last remnant of the Papal States and Papal temporal power.

=== October ===
- October 2 – A plebiscite held in Rome supports, by 133,681 votes to 1,507, the annexation of the city by Italy.
- October 6 – Rome becomes the capital of unified Italy.
- October 8 – Léon Gambetta escapes besieged Paris in a hot-air balloon.
- October 20
  - The First Vatican Council adjourns.
  - A 6.6 earthquake shakes the Canadian province of Quebec, killing 6 people.
- October 26 – The Chinese leaders of June's Tianjin Massacre of foreigners are executed by China's Imperial government.
- October 27 – Franco-Prussian War: Siege of Metz – Marshal François Achille Bazaine, commanding the French left wing, is forced by starvation to surrender the fortifications of Metz.

=== November ===
- November 1 – In the United States, the newly created Weather Bureau (later renamed the National Weather Service) makes its first official meteorological forecast: "High winds at Chicago and Milwaukee... and along the Lakes".
- November 16 – The Spanish Cortes Generales proclaims Amadeo de Saboya as King Amadeo I of Spain.

=== December ===
- December 12 – Joseph H. Rainey of South Carolina becomes the second black U.S. congressman (following Hiram Rhodes Revels in February).
- December 28 – Juan Prim, Prime Minister of Spain, is shot by unknown assassins on leaving the Cortes. He dies two days later.
- December 31
  - Sir Henry Barkly is appointed Governor of the Cape of Good Hope and High Commissioner for Southern Africa.
  - The 12.8 km (8.0 mi) Fréjus Rail Tunnel through the Alps is completed.

=== Date unknown ===
- David Kenyon invents the fireman's pole in Chicago.
- Graeter's ice cream is originated in Cincinnati, Ohio.
- Just one of the 916 members of the Indian Civil Service is Indian.

== Births ==
=== January–March ===
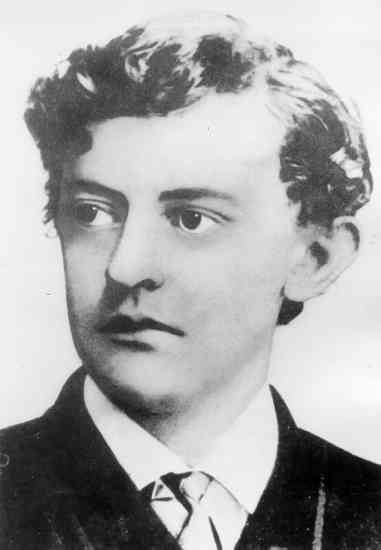
Ernst Barlach

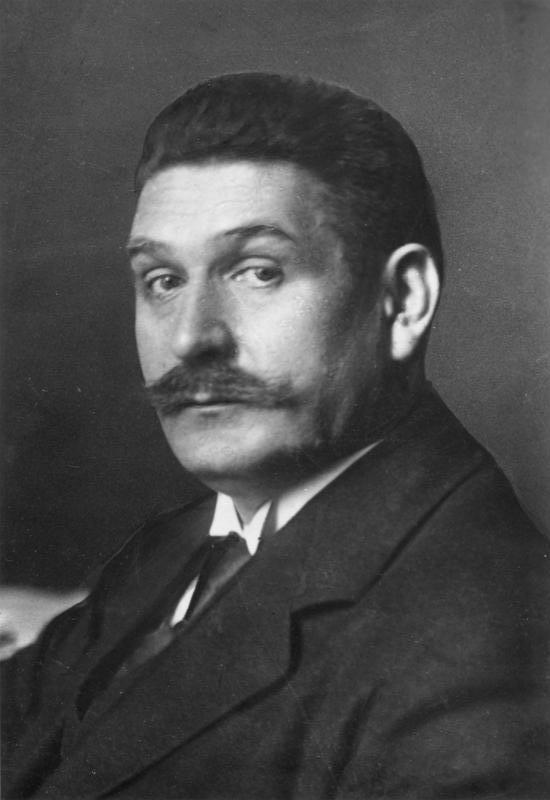
Gustav Bauer

- January 2 – Ernst Barlach, German sculptor, graphic artist and poet (d. 1938)
- January 6 – Gustav Bauer, Chancellor of Germany (d. 1944)
- January 4 – Helena Willman-Grabowska, Polish indologist, Sorbonne and Jagiellonian University professor (d. 1957)
- January 8
  - Walter Edwards, American film director (d. 1920)
  - Miguel Primo de Rivera, dictator of Spain (d. 1930)
- January 11 – Alexander Stirling Calder, American sculptor (d. 1945)
- January 14 – George Pearce, Australian politician (d. 1952)
- January 20 – Ajahn Mun Bhuridatta, Thai Buddhist monk (d. 1949)
- January 23 – William G. Morgan, American inventor of volleyball (d. 1942)
- February 1 – Erik Adolf von Willebrand, Finnish physician (d. 1949)
- February 7 – Alfred Adler, Austrian psychologist (d. 1937)
- February 12
  - Marie Lloyd, English singer (d. 1922)
  - Hugo Stinnes, German industrialist, politician (d. 1924)
- February 20 – Jay Johnson Morrow, American military engineer, politician, 3rd Governor of the Panama Canal Zone (d. 1937)
- February 25 – Jelica Belović-Bernardzikowska, Croatian writer (d. 1946)
- March 5 – Frank Norris, American writer (d. 1902)
- March 10 – Ester Rachel Kamińska, Polish actress, "mother of Yiddish theatre" (d. 1925)
- March 13 – Seale Harris, American physician (d. 1957)
- March 17 – Horace Donisthorpe, English entomologist (d. 1951)
- March 20 – Paul von Lettow-Vorbeck, German general (d. 1964)
- March 22 – Arthur Storch (sculptor) (d. 1947)
- March 29 – Pavlos Melas, Greek revolutionary and army officer (d. 1904)
- March 31 – James M. Cox, Democratic candidate for President of the United States in the election of 1920 (d. 1957)

=== April–June ===
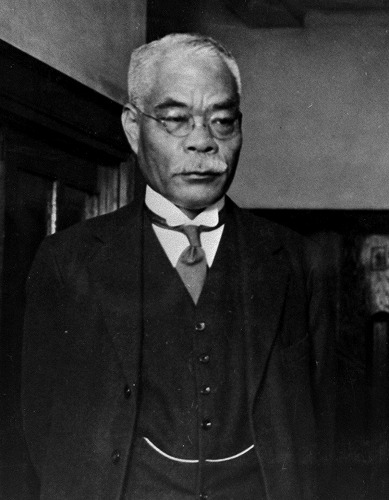
Hamaguchi Osachi

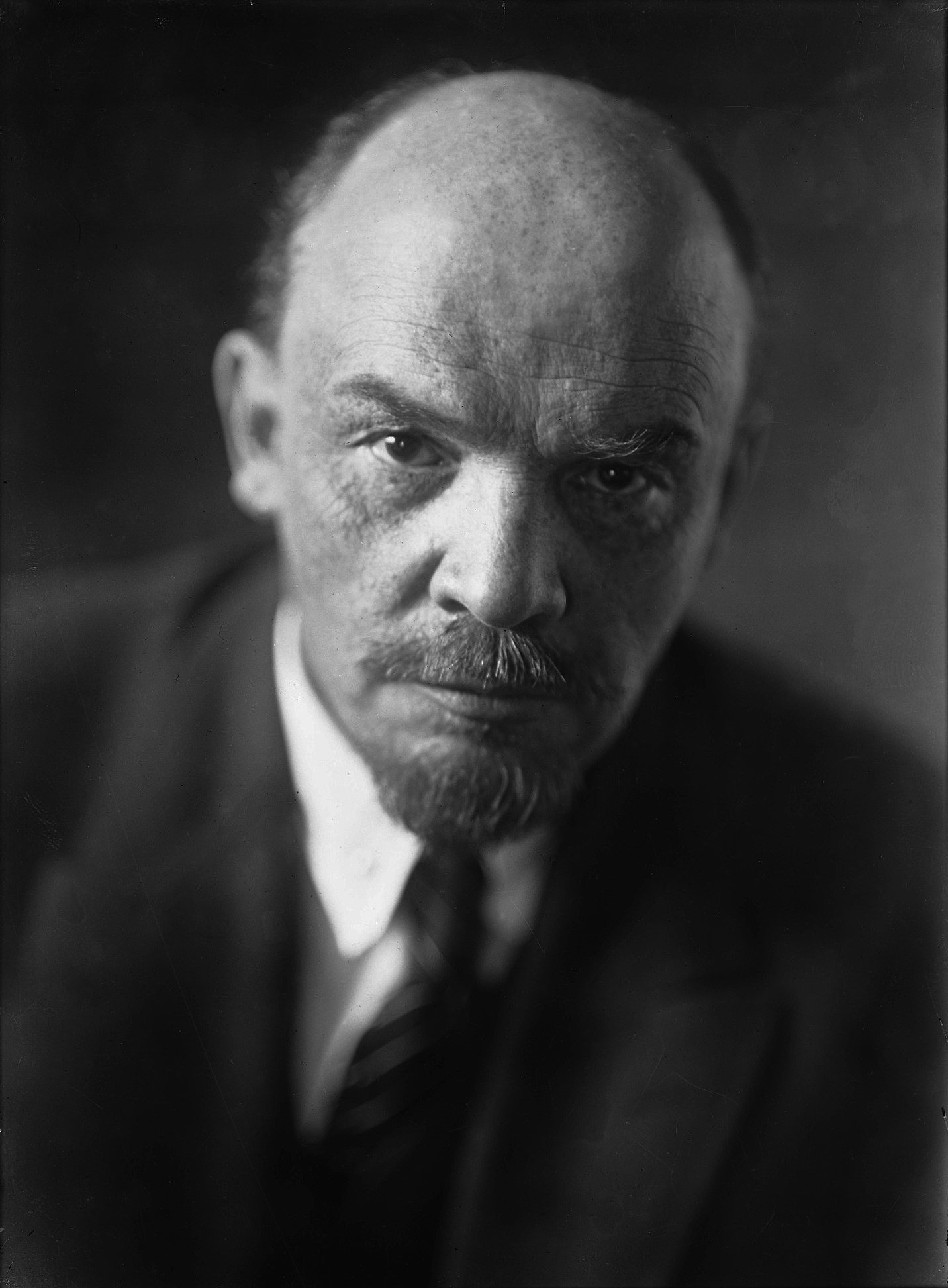
Vladimir Lenin

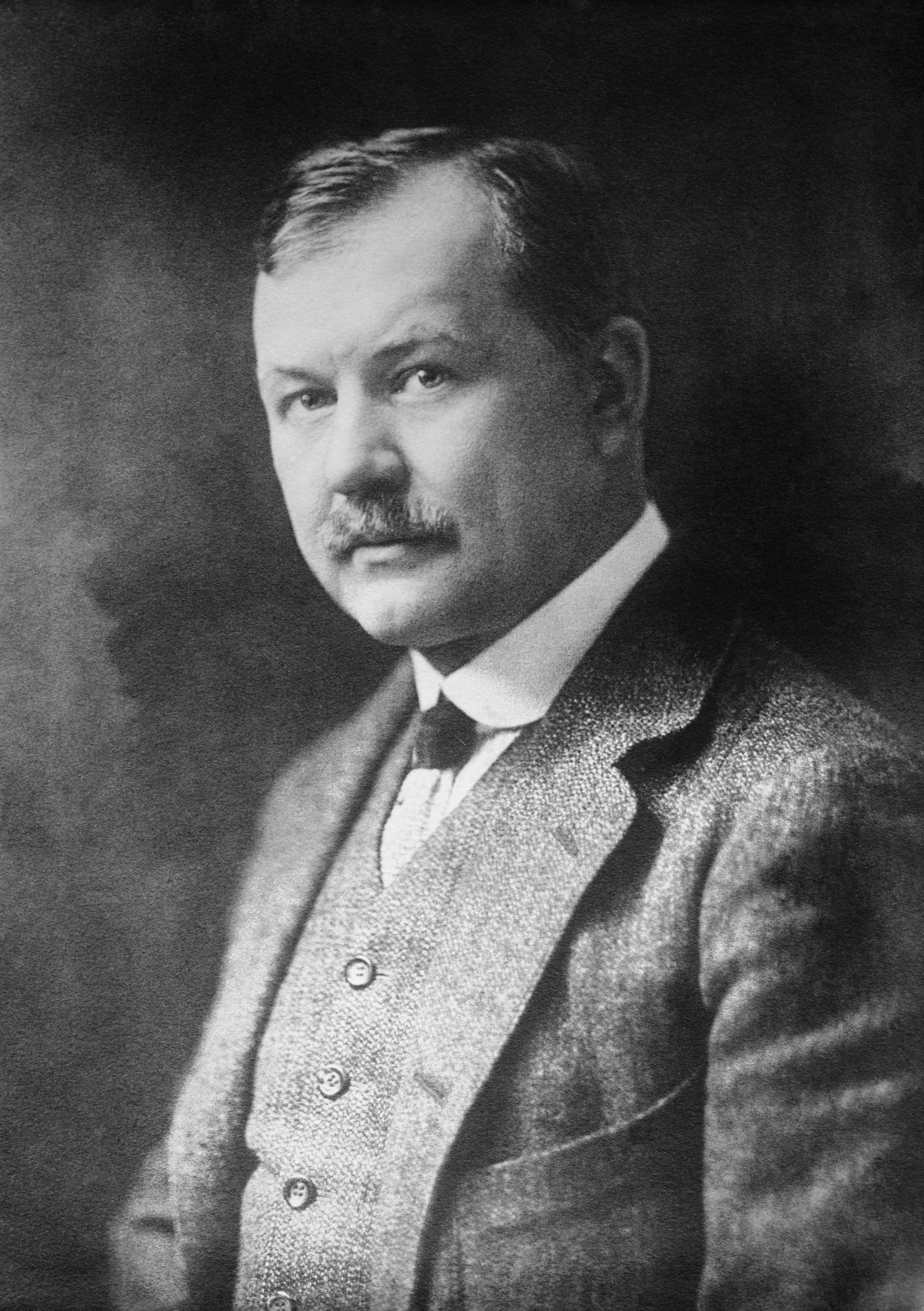
Franz Lehár

- April 1 – Hamaguchi Osachi, 27th Prime Minister of Japan (d. 1931)
- April 4 – George Albert Smith, 8th president of The Church of Jesus Christ of Latter-day Saints (d. 1951)
- April 17 – Ray Stannard Baker, American journalist, author (d. 1946)
- April 19 – J. Howard Crocker, Canadian educator and sports executive (d. 1959)
- April 21 – Edwin S. Porter, American film director (d. 1941)
- April 22 – Vladimir Lenin, Russian revolutionary, first Premier of the Soviet Union (d. 1924)
- April 24 – Friedrich Freiherr Kress von Kressenstein, German general (d. 1948)
- April 30 – Franz Lehár, Austrian composer (d. 1948)
- May 9 – Harry Vardon, English golf professional (d. 1937)
- May 10 – Reginald Tyrwhitt, British admiral (d. 1951)
- May 16 – Karel Kašpar, Czechoslovak cardinal and archbishop (d. 1941)
- May 19 – Albert Fish, American serial killer (d. 1936)
- May 24
  - Benjamin N. Cardozo, Associate Justice of the Supreme Court of the United States (d. 1938)
  - Jan Smuts, South African soldier, statesman (d. 1950)
- June 13 – Jules Bordet, Belgian immunologist, microbiologist, recipient of the Nobel Prize in Physiology or Medicine (d. 1961)
- June 18 – Édouard Le Roy, French mathematician and philosopher (d. 1954)
- June 20 – Georges Dufrénoy, French post-impressionist painter (d. 1943)

=== July–September ===
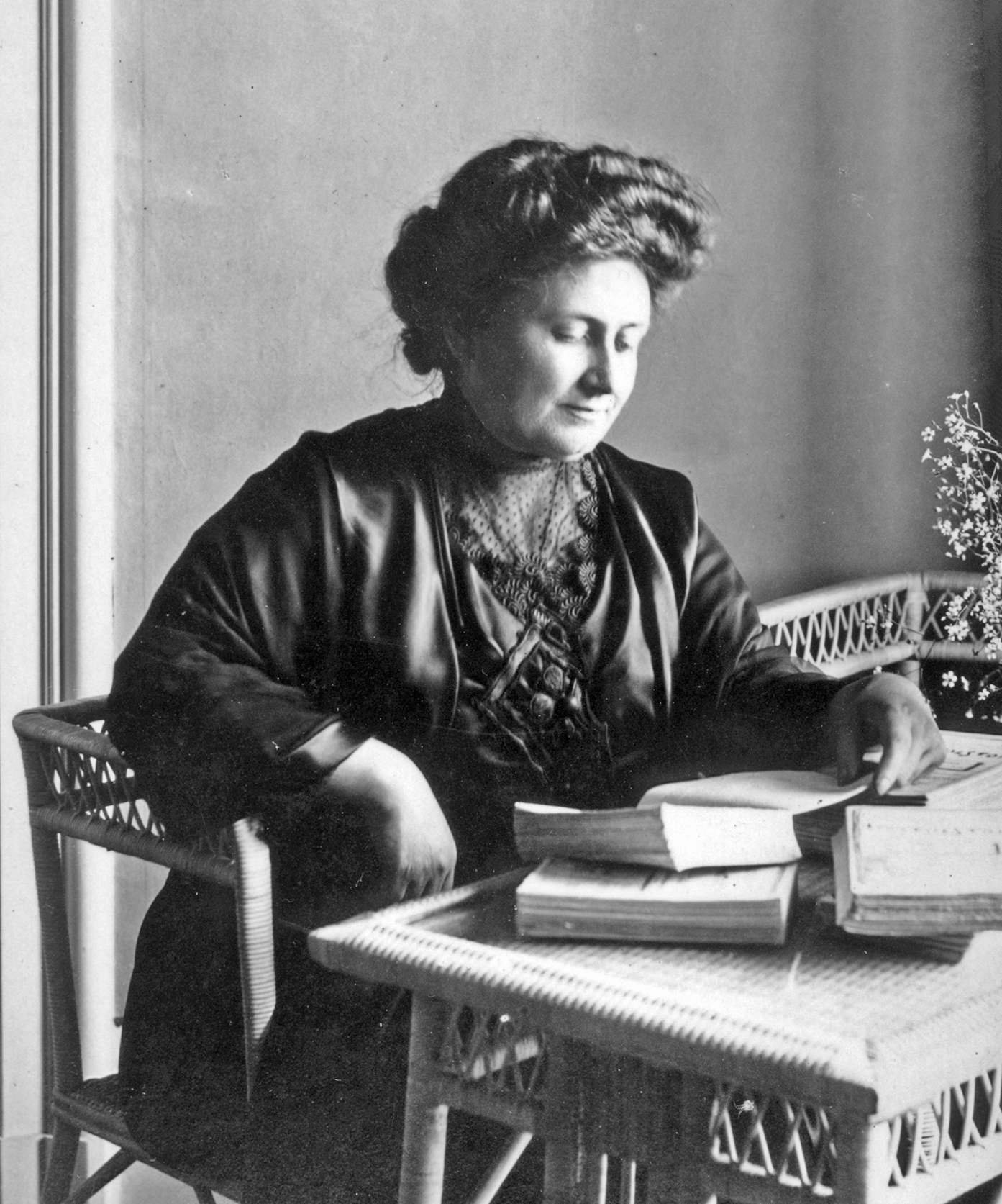
Maria Montessori

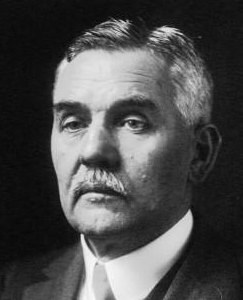
Georges Claude

- July 3 – R. B. Bennett, 11th Prime Minister of Canada (d. 1947)
- July 12 – Louis II, Prince of Monaco (d. 1949)
- July 25 – Maxfield Parrish, American illustrator (d. 1966)
- July 26 – Charles Becker, American policeman and murderer (d. 1915)
- July 27 – Hilaire Belloc, French/English man of letters (d. 1953)
- July 29 – George Dixon, Canadian boxer (d. 1909)
- August 2 – Marianne Weber, German sociologist and suffragist (d. 1954)
- August 4 – Harry Lauder, Scottish entertainer (d. 1950)
- August 10 – Hans Zenker, German admiral (d. 1932)
- August 11 – Tom Richardson, English cricketer (d. 1912)
- August 12 – Hubert Gough, British general (d. 1963)
- August 20 – Edward Stanley Kellogg, 16th Governor of American Samoa (d. 1948)
- August 31 – Maria Montessori, Italian educator (d. 1952)
- September 24 – Georges Claude, French engineer, inventor (d. 1960)
- September 26 – King Christian X of Denmark (d. 1947)
- September 30
  - Jean Baptiste Perrin, French physicist, Nobel Prize laureate (d. 1942)
  - Thomas W. Lamont, American banker (d. 1948)

=== October–December ===
- October 2 – Horace Hood, British admiral (d. 1916)
- October 4 – Karl Renner, 1st Chancellor of Austria (d. 1950)
- October 10 – Ivan Bunin, Russian writer, Nobel Prize laureate (d. 1953)
- October 18 – D. T. Suzuki, Japanese philosopher (d. 1966)
- October 22 – Johan Ludwig Mowinckel, Norwegian businessman, Prime Minister of Norway (d. 1943)
- October 25 – Elsa Reger, German writer (d. 1951)
- October 30 – Lawrence Grant, English actor (d. 1952)
- November 21 – Sigfrid Edström, Swedish sports official, President of the International Olympic Committee (d. 1964)
- November 25 – Solanus Casey, beatified American priest (d. 1957)
- November 27 – Juho Kusti Paasikivi, Prime Minister and President of Finland (d. 1956)
- November 28 – Gustavus M. Blech, German-American physician, surgeon (d. 1949)
- November 29 – Trixie Friganza, American actress (d. 1955)
- December 5 – Vítězslav Novák, Czech composer (d. 1949)
- December 9 – Francisco S. Carvajal, 36th President of Mexico (d. 1932)
- December 10 – Jadunath Sarkar, Indian historian (d. 1958)
- December 14
  - Dirk Jan de Geer, Prime Minister of the Netherlands (d. 1960)
  - Karl Renner, 4th President of Austria (d. 1950)
- December 18 – Saki, English writer (d. 1916)
- December 31 (alleged) – Mbah Gotho, Indonesian man, alleged oldest human (d. 2017)

== Deaths ==
=== January–June ===
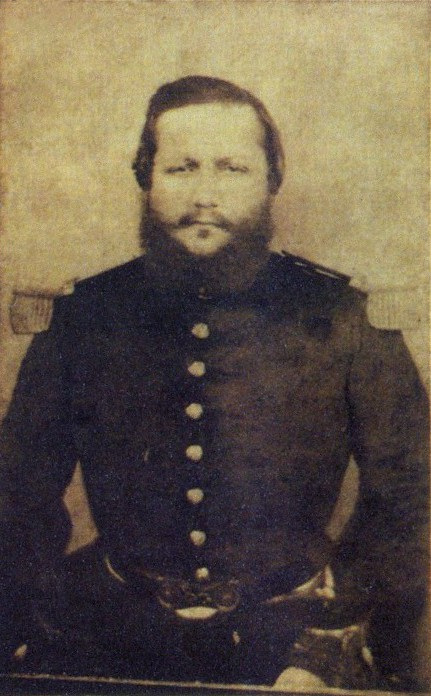
Francisco Solano López

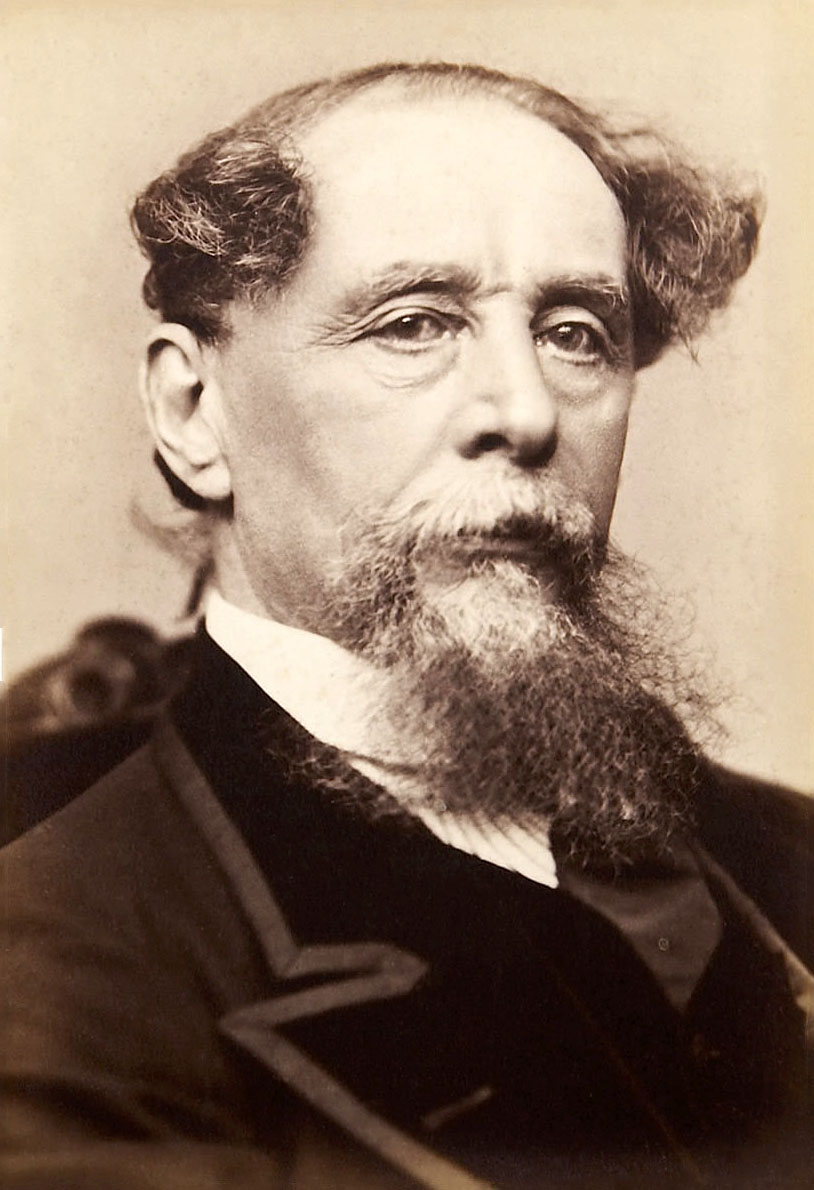
Charles Dickens

- January 20 – Sir George Seymour, British admiral of the fleet (b. 1787)
- January 25 – Victor de Broglie, Prime Minister of France (b. 1785)
- January 29 – Leopold II, Grand Duke of Tuscany (b. 1797)
- February 7 – Sylvain Salnave, Haitian general, 9th President of Haiti (b. 1827)
- February 11 – Carlos Soublette, 2-time President of Venezuela (b. 1789)
- February 19 – Nathaniel de Rothschild, French wine grower (b. 1812)
- March 1 – Francisco Solano López, 2nd President of Paraguay (killed in action) (b. 1827)
- March 3 – Henry Light, third governor of British Guiana (b. 1783)
- March 4 – Thomas Scott, Canadian Orangeman, surveyor of the Red River Rebellion (shot by Louis Riel and the Métis) (b. c. 1842)
- March 11 – Moshoeshoe I of Lesotho (b. 1786?)
- March 28 – George Henry Thomas, American general (b. 1816)
- April 11 – Justo José de Urquiza, General, First constitutional President of Argentina (assassinated) (b. 1801)
- April 15 – Emma Willard, American women's rights activist (b. 1787)
- April 16 – Domnița Rallou Caragea, Greek princess, independence activist (b. 1799)
- May 6 – Sir James Young Simpson, Scottish physician, researcher (b. 1811)
- June 6 – Ferdinand von Wrangel, Baltic-German explorer (b. 1796/1797)
- June 7 – Friedrich Hohe, German lithographer, painter (b. 1802)
- June 9 – Charles Dickens, British novelist (b. 1812)
- June 20 – Jules de Goncourt, French writer, publisher (b. 1830)
- June 23 – Mírzá Mihdí, youngest child of Baháʼí founder Baháʼu'lláh (b. 1848)
- June 27 – Cyrus Kingsbury, American missionary to Choctaw Indians (b. 1786)

=== July–December ===
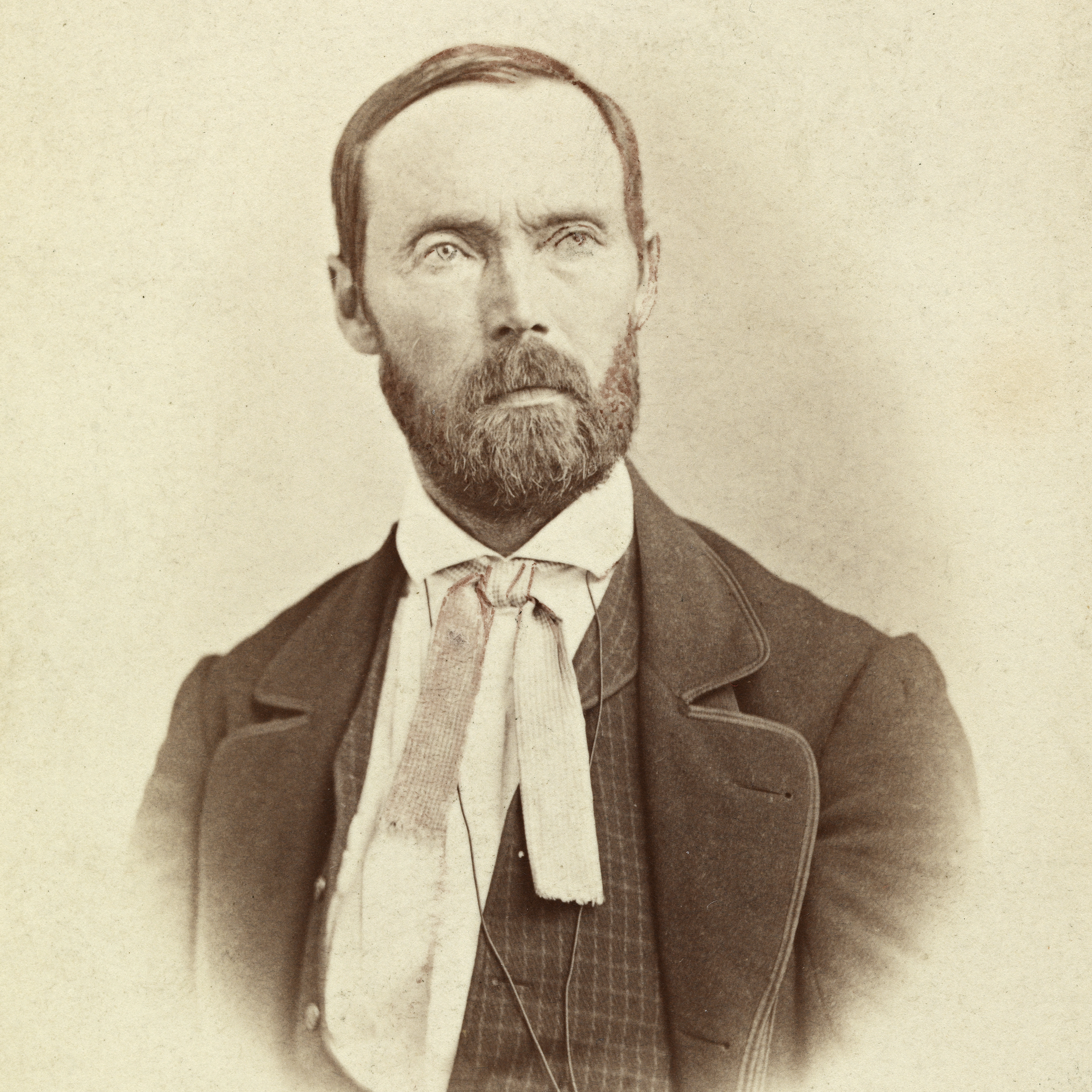
Aasmund Olavsson Vinje

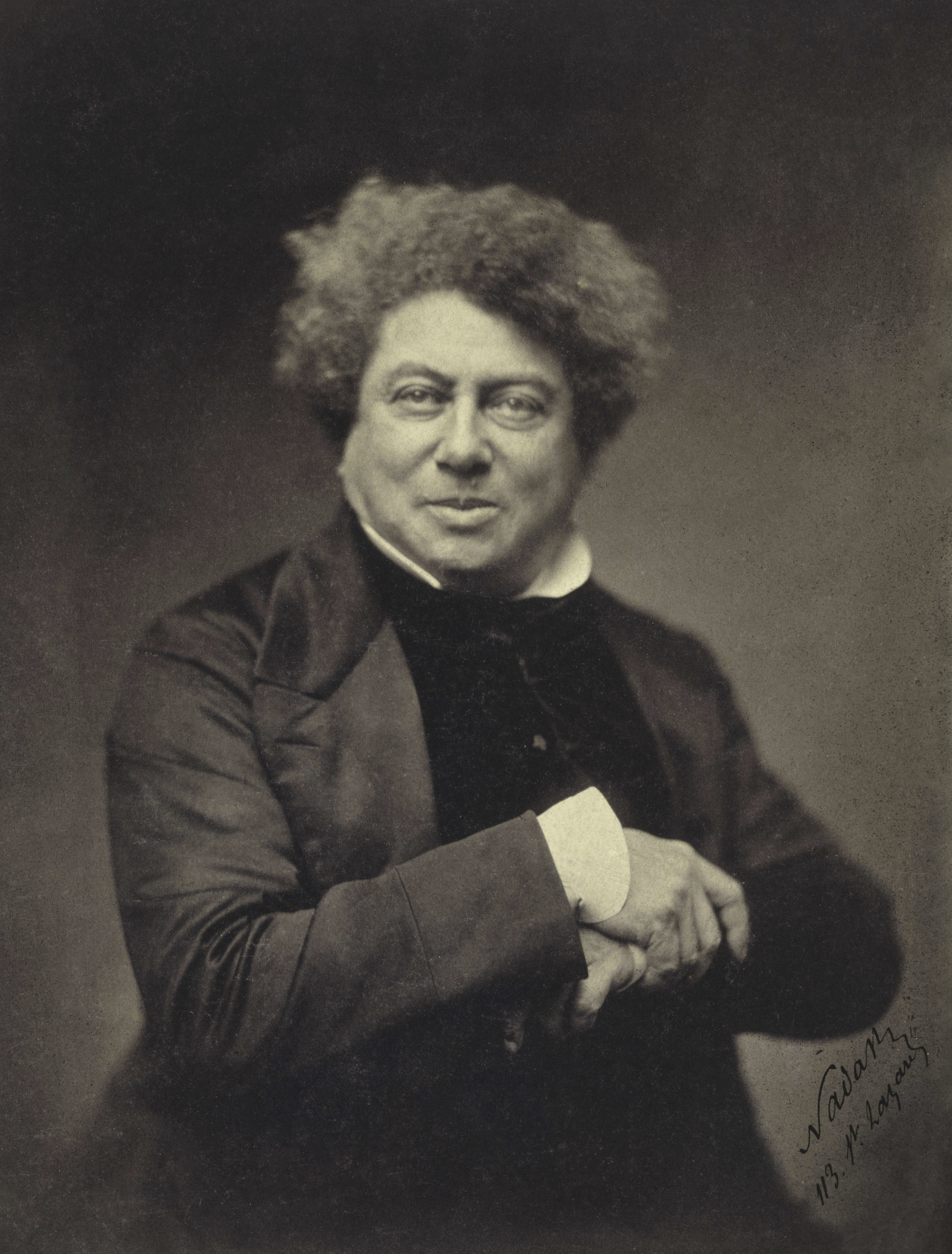
Alexandre Dumas, père

- July 10 – Pelaghia Roșu, Romanian heroine (b. 1800)
- July 22 – Josef Strauss, Austrian composer (b. 1827)
- August 4 – Abel Douay, French general (killed in action) (b. 1809)
- August 14 – David Farragut, American admiral (b. 1801)
- August 17 – Pedro Figueredo, Cuban poet, musician and freedom fighter (b. 1818)
- September 4 – Juan Javier Espinosa, 9th President of Ecuador (b. 1815)
- September 23 – Prosper Mérimée, French writer (b. 1803)
- September 27 – William F. Packer, American politician (b. 1807)
- October 12
  - Stephen Greenleaf Bulfinch, American minister, hymn writer (b. 1809)
  - Robert E. Lee, Confederate general (b. 1807)
- November 3 – Diego Noboa, 4th President of Ecuador (b. 1789)
- November 23 – Giuseppina Bozzacchi, Milanese-born ballerina (b. 1853) (result of deprivation during Siege of Paris)
- November 24 – Comte de Lautréamont, French poet, writer (b. 1846)
- November 26 – Franz Graf von Wimpffen, Austrian general and admiral (b. 1797)
- November 28 – Frédéric Bazille, French painter (b. 1841)
- December 5
  - David G. Burnet, early politician within the Republic of Texas (b. 1788)
  - Alexandre Dumas, père, French author (b. 1802)
- December 9 – Patrick MacDowell, Northern Irish sculptor (b. 1799)
- December 27 – Juan Prim, Spanish general and prime minister (assassinated) (b. 1814)
