= Frank King =

Frank or Francis King may refer to:

== Sports ==
- Frank King (English cricketer) (1911–1996), English cricketer, played for Cambridge University 1934–35 and Dorset 1937–54
- Frank King (West Indian cricketer) (1926–1990), West Indian Test cricketer
- Frank King (footballer) (1917–2003), English soccer player
- Frank King (ice hockey) (1929-2004), retired ice hockey player
- Frank A. King, American football coach
- Frankie King (born 1972), American basketball player

== Politics ==
- Frank King (Australian politician) (1912–1981), Australian politician
- Frank King (Irish politician), Irish politician
- Frank W. King (1912–1988), Democratic leader and member of the Ohio Senate

== Military ==
- Frank King (British Army officer) (1919–1998), British Army general
- Frank Ragan King (1884–1919), officer in the United States Navy

== Other ==
- Frank King (cartoonist) (1883–1969), American cartoonist
- Frank King (producer) (1913–1989), film producer
- Francis King (novelist) (1923–2011), British novelist, short-story writer and critic
- Francis X. King (1934–1994), British occult writer and editor
- Francis T. King (1819–1891), Baltimore merchant and Quaker
