= Gerard T. Hopkins =

Nineteenth century Quaker and businessman (1769-1834)

- Born: Gerard Thomas Hopkins; October 24, 1769; Anne Arundel County, Maryland, British America
- Died: March 27, 1834 (aged 64); Baltimore, Maryland, U.S.
- Resting place: Friends Burial Ground
- Spouse: Dorothy Brooke (m. 1796)
- Children: 8
- Relatives: Johns Hopkins (nephew)

Gerard Thomas Hopkins (October 24, 1769 – March 27, 1834) was an American merchant, Quaker religious leader, and uncle to philanthropist Johns Hopkins. Gerard Thomas Hopkins was born on October 24, 1769, in Anne Arundel County, Maryland to Elizabeth Thomas and Johns Hopkins, Senior (grandfather and eponym of Johns Hopkins the philanthropist). On April 16, 1796, at the age of 26, Hopkins married Dorothy Brooke at the Sandy Spring Meeting House in Montgomery County, Maryland. The couple would go on to have eight children: Mary, Deborah, Elizabeth, Thomas, William, Gerard, Jr., Margaret, and Rachel. Eventually, they moved to Baltimore, Maryland, where Gerard opened his wholesale grocery business and became clerk of the Meeting of the Society of Friends at Baltimore for the Western Shore of Maryland and the adjacent parts of Pennsylvania and Virginia.

In 1812, Gerard’s nephew Johns Hopkins, then age 17, came to work at Gerard’s business in the “counting room” of his grocery store. It is said that during this time, Gerard’s daughter, Elizabeth Hopkins, became Johns’ first love. Yet, due to the Quaker faith’s strong opposition to first-cousin marriage, the two never wed. Elizabeth was born in Baltimore, MD in February of 1802. She became a member of the Orthodox Meeting of Friends around 1833. Later dying at 88 years old on December 9th, 1890. Her death was due to a fall at her home, where she fractured her leg. Elizabeth was buried on December 11,1890.

Hopkins was a well-known anti-slavery activist and advocate for the welfare of Native Americans. In 1789, he was a founding member of the Maryland Society for Promoting the Abolition of Slavery and Relief of Free Negroes, and Others, Unlawfully Held in Bondage. In 1804, he travelled to Indiana to visit tribes in the West, and his journal of this trip was published posthumously by Martha Ellicott Tyson. In 1807, he corresponded with Thomas Jefferson about the trans-Atlantic slave trade.

Gerard T. Hopkins died on March 27, 1834, in Baltimore at the age of 64. He was buried in the Friends Burial Ground in Baltimore.
