= SS Johns Hopkins =

Liberty ship of WWII

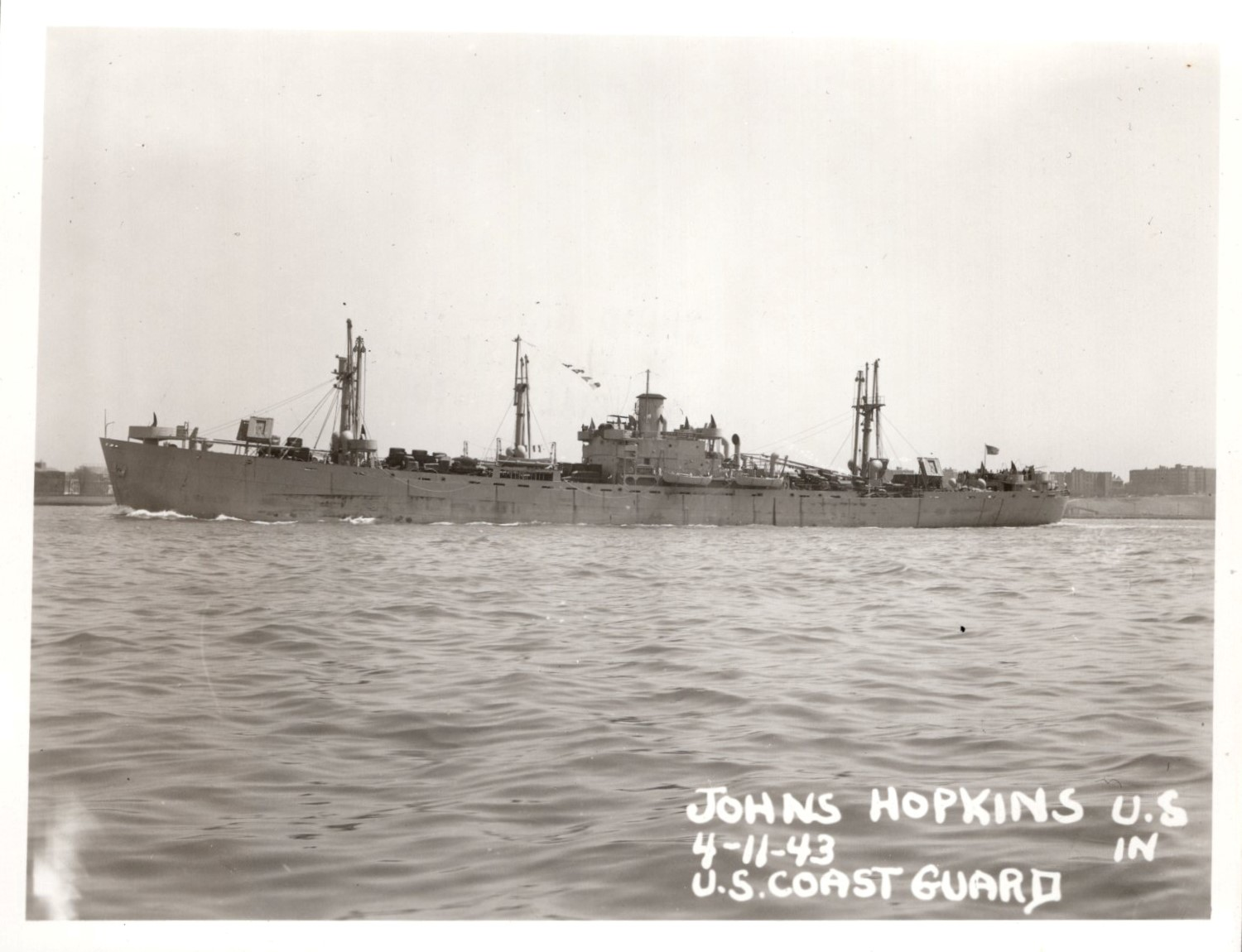
- Liberty ship SS Johns Hopkins, 11 April 1943

History

United States
- Name: Johns Hopkins
- Namesake: Johns Hopkins
- Owner: War Shipping Administration (WSA)
- Operator: North Atlantic & Gulf Steamship Co.
- Ordered: as type (EC2-S-C1) hull, MCE hull 947
- Awarded: 30 January 1942
- Builder: Bethlehem-Fairfield Shipyard, Baltimore, Maryland
- Cost: $1,067,726
- Yard number: 2097
- Way number: 2
- Laid down: 15 January 1943
- Launched: 28 February 1943
- Completed: 27 March 1943
- Identification: Call sign: KKMY
- Fate: Sold, 6 November 1946

Honduras
- Name: Thetis
- Owner: Compania Internacional de Vapores, Ltd. (1946–1950); Compania Commercial Maritima (1950–1952)
- Operator: Simpson, Spence & Young (1946–1949); North American Shipping & Trading Co. (1949–1950)
- Fate: Sold, 1952

Honduras
- Name: Santa Elena
- Owner: Compania de Commercio y Vapores, Ltd.
- Operator: D.J. Negroponte
- Fate: Sold, 1960

Greece
- Name: Eleni K.
- Owner: Eleni Shipping Co.
- Operator: Taflambas Bros. (1960–1961); Stathatos & Co. (1961–1966)
- Fate: Wrecked and abandoned, 1966

General characteristics
- Class & type: Liberty ship; type EC2-S-C1, standard
- Tonnage: 10,865 LT DWT; 7,176 GRT
- Displacement: 3,380 long tons (3,434 t) (light); 14,245 long tons (14,474 t) (max)
- Length: 441 feet 6 inches (135 m) oa; 416 feet (127 m) pp; 427 feet (130 m) lwl
- Beam: 57 feet (17 m)
- Draft: 27 ft 9.25 in (8.4646 m)
- Installed power: 2 × Oil fired 450 °F (232 °C) boilers, operating at 220 psi (1,500 kPa); 2,500 hp (1,900 kW)
- Propulsion: 1 × triple-expansion steam engine, (manufactured by Vulcan Iron Works, Wilkes-Barre, Pennsylvania); 1 × screw propeller
- Speed: 11.5 knots (21.3 km/h; 13.2 mph)
- Capacity: 562,608 cubic feet (15,931 m^{3}) (grain); 499,573 cubic feet (14,146 m^{3}) (bale)
- Complement: 38–62 USMM; 21–40 USNAG
- Armament: Varied by ship; Bow-mounted 3-inch (76 mm)/50-caliber gun; Stern-mounted 4-inch (102 mm)/50-caliber gun; 2–8 × single 20-millimeter (0.79 in) Oerlikon anti-aircraft (AA) cannons and/or, 2–8 × 37-millimeter (1.46 in) M1 AA guns

SS Johns Hopkins was a Liberty ship built in the United States during World War II. She was named after Johns Hopkins, was an American merchant, investor, and philanthropist. Following his death, his bequests founded numerous institutions bearing his name, most notably Johns Hopkins Hospital and the Johns Hopkins University system.

== Construction ==
Johns Hopkins was laid down on 15 January 1943, under a Maritime Commission (MARCOM) contract, MCE hull 947, by the Bethlehem-Fairfield Shipyard, Baltimore, Maryland; she was launched on 28 February 1943.

== History ==
She was allocated to the North Atlantic & Gulf Steamship Co., on 27 March 1943.

On 2 October 1944, at 01:50, she struck a mine, at 43°16′48″N 05°08′28″E, while en route from Marseille to Toulon, France. The mine struck between the #3 hold and the engine room on the port side. The ship lost power as the engine room and #3 hold began to flood rapidly. The shaft alley began to flood which caused the #4 and #5 holds to slowly flood. Johns Hopkins quickly took on a 35° list to port and began to drift in the high winds. Distress calls where sent out after repairs to the radio, that was damaged in the blast, were made. Hobson arrived around 02:30, but was unsuccessful in her attempts to come along the damaged Johns Hopkins, due to the rough seas and high winds. Hobson stood by until ATR-127 arrived at 06:00 and towed Johns Hopkins back to Marseille, where she arrived at 04:00, on 3 October 1944.

Johns Hopkins had been carrying US and Free French Army personnel, in addition to general cargo, vehicles, and half-tracks and trucks placed on all the cargo hatches, except hold #3. Two lifeboats were lost when they were lowered and lost in the rough seas. Of the 536 aboard, only a US Army major was injured when he broke his leg falling into the #3 hold.

She was repaired and placed back in service.

On 6 November 1946, she was sold for $544,200, to Compania Internacional de Vapores, Ltd., and renamed Thetis. She was later renamed Santa Elena in 1952 and Eleni K. in 1960. On 29 September 1966, 8 mi (13 km) out from Thevenard, Australia, en route from Port Lincoln to the United Kingdom, with a load of wheat, she broke in two in heavy seas and foundered in shallow waters. On 17 November 1966, she was refloated and beached on Goat Island, 32°18′S 133°32′E.

== Bibliography ==
- "Bethlehem-Fairfield, Baltimore MD". www.ShipbuildingHistory.com. 7 August 2021.
- Maritime Administration. "Johns Hopkins". Ship History Database Vessel Status Card. U.S. Department of Transportation, Maritime Administration.
- Davies, James (May 2004). "Specifications (As-Built)" (PDF). p. 23.
- "SS Johns Hopkins".
- Williams, Greg H. (2014). The Liberty Ships of World War II. Jefferson, North Carolina: McFarland & Company, Inc. ISBN 9780786479450.
- Sawyer, L.A.; Mitchell, W.H. (1985). The Liberty Ships. Bury St. Edmunds, Suffolk, Great Britain: St. Edmundsbury Press Ltd. ISBN 1850440492.
