= Johns Hopkins =

American businessman and philanthropist (1795–1873)

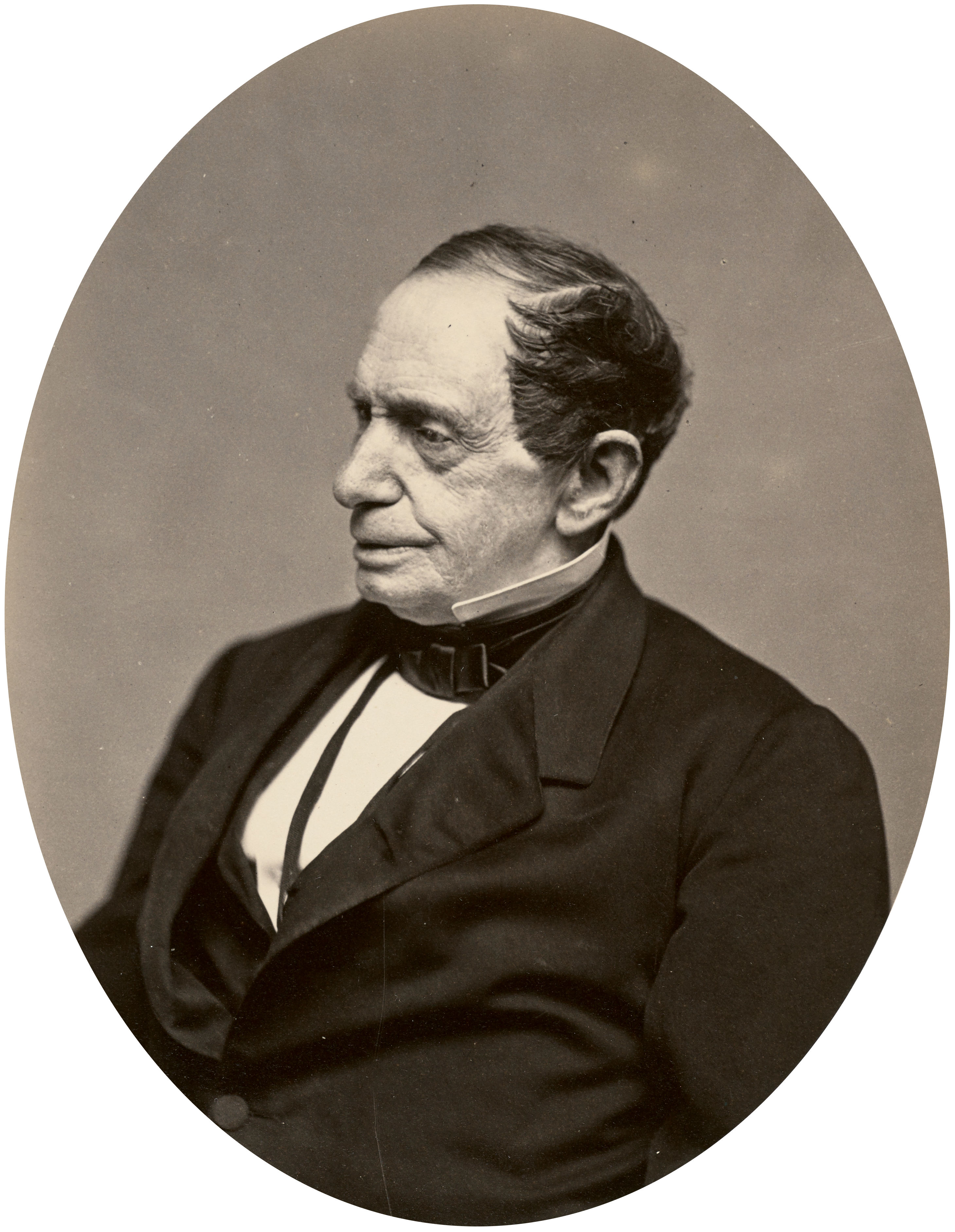
- Hopkins, c. 1871
- Born: May 19, 1795; Gambrills, Maryland, U.S.
- Died: December 24, 1873 (aged 78); Baltimore, Maryland, U.S.
- Burial place: Green Mount Cemetery
- Monuments: Johns Hopkins Monument at Johns Hopkins University
- Education: Free School of Anne Arundel County
- Occupations: Entrepreneur; investor; philanthropist
- Relatives: Gerard T. Hopkins (uncle)

Johns Hopkins (May 19, 1795 – December 24, 1873) was an American merchant, investor, and philanthropist best known for funding the establishment of Johns Hopkins University and Johns Hopkins Hospital, which have since become leading institutions for scientific research and medical advancements. At the time of his death, his donation was the largest philanthropic bequest ever made to an American educational institution.

Born on a plantation in Anne Arundel County, Maryland, Hopkins left his home to start a career at the age of seventeen, and settled in Baltimore, Maryland, where he remained for most of his life. He accumulated his fortune primarily through investing in the Baltimore and Ohio Railroad (B&O), for which he later served as finance director. He was also president of Baltimore-based Merchants' National Bank. (Note: See Merchants' National Bank Building (1895), Baltimore)

A Quaker, Hopkins strongly backed Abraham Lincoln and the Union during the American Civil War and was described as holding "antislavery political views." In 2020, new archival research prompted renewed scholarly debate over Hopkins’s relationship to slavery and his long-standing reputation as a staunch abolitionist. Researchers affiliated with Johns Hopkins University reported evidence suggesting that he may have owned or employed enslaved people earlier in his life, while other scholars have disputed these findings and emphasized his documented opposition to slavery and philanthropic support for Black education and social welfare.

== Early life and education ==
Johns Hopkins was born on May 19, 1795, at his family's home of White's Hall, a 500-acre (200 ha) tobacco plantation in Anne Arundel County, Maryland. His first name was inherited from his grandfather Johns Hopkins, who received his first name from his mother Margaret Johns. He was one of eleven children born to Samuel Hopkins of Crofton, Maryland, and Hannah Janney, of Loudoun County, Virginia.

The Hopkins family were of English and Welsh descent and Quakers. Hopkins' sister, Sarah Hopkins Janney became a prominent member, and eventually an elder, at Baltimore Quaker Meeting. They emancipated their slaves in 1778 in accordance with their Quaker meeting's decree, which called for freeing the able-bodied and caring for the others, who would remain at the plantation and provide labor as they could. The second eldest of eleven children, Hopkins was required to work on the farm alongside his siblings and indentured and free Black laborers. From 1806 to 1809, he likely attended The Free School of Anne Arundel County, which was located in modern-day Davidsonville, Maryland.

In 1812, at the age of 17, Hopkins left the plantation to work in his uncle Gerard T. Hopkins's Baltimore wholesale grocery business. Gerard T. Hopkins was an established merchant and clerk of the Baltimore Yearly Meeting of Friends. While living with his uncle's family, Johns and his cousin, Elizabeth, fell in love; however, the Quaker taboo against the marriage of first cousins was strong, and neither Johns nor Elizabeth ever married.

== Career ==
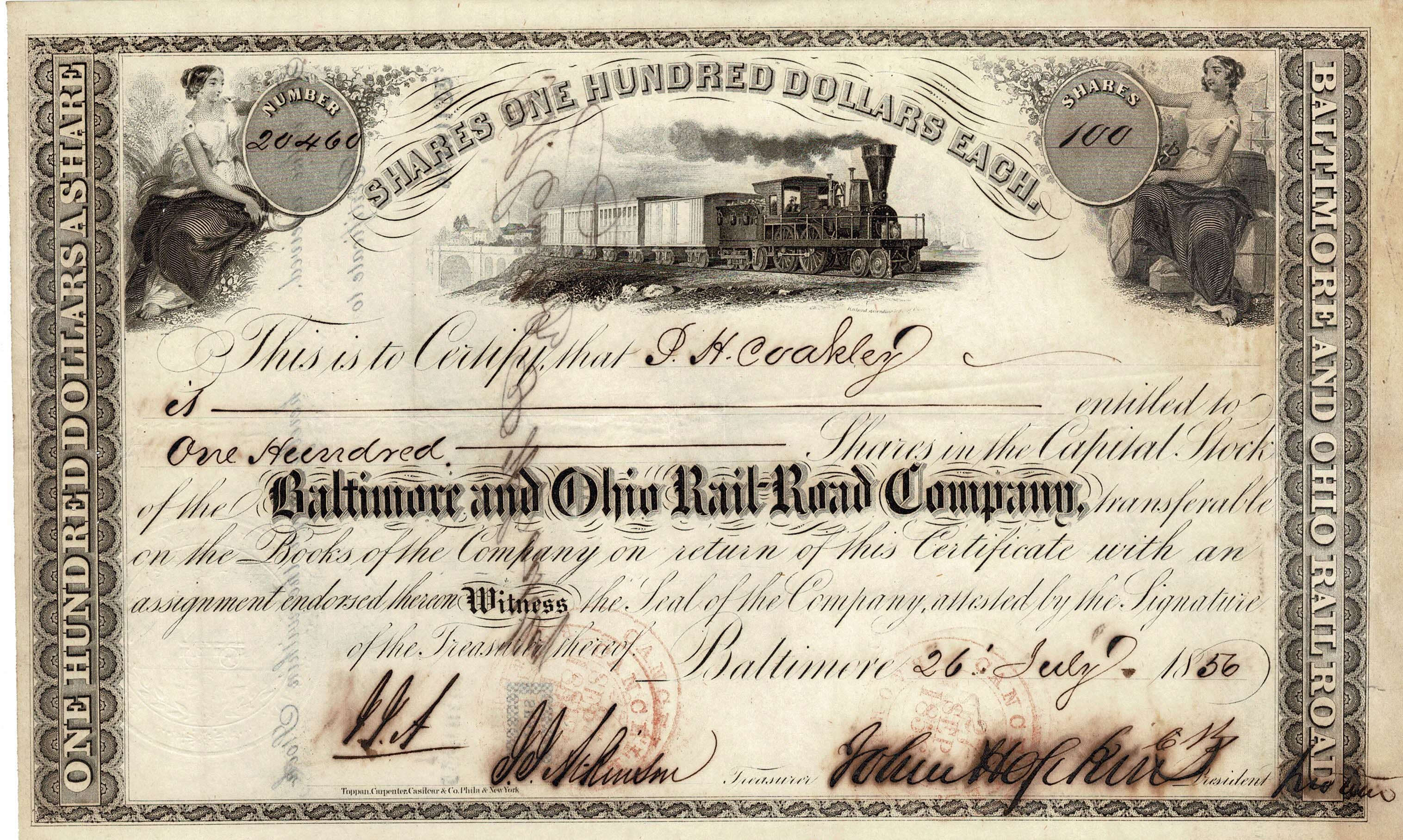
Share of the Baltimore and Ohio Railroad, issued July 26, 1856, and signed by Johns Hopkins as the company's pro tem president

Hopkins's early experiences and successes in business came when he was put in charge of the store while his uncle was away during the War of 1812. After seven years with his uncle, Hopkins went into business together with Benjamin Moore, a fellow Quaker. The business partnership was later dissolved with Moore alleging Hopkins's penchant for capital accumulation as the cause for the divide.

After Moore's withdrawal, Hopkins partnered with three of his brothers and established Hopkins & Brothers Wholesalers in 1819. The company prospered by selling various wares in the Shenandoah Valley from Conestoga wagons, sometimes in exchange for corn whiskey, which was then sold in Baltimore as "Hopkins' Best". The bulk of Hopkins's fortune, however, was made by his judicious investments in myriad ventures, most notably the Baltimore and Ohio Railroad (B&O), of which he became a director in 1847 and chairman of the Finance Committee in 1855. He was also President of Merchants' Bank as well as director of a number of other organizations. After a successful career, Hopkins was able to retire at the age of 52 in 1847.

A charitable individual, Hopkins put up his own money more than once to not only aid Baltimore City during times of financial crises but also to twice bail the Baltimore and Ohio Railroad company out of debt, in 1857 and 1873.

In 1996, Johns Hopkins ranked 69th in "The Wealthy 100: From Benjamin Franklin to Bill Gates: A Ranking of the Richest Americans, Past and Present".

== Civil War ==
One of the first campaigns of the American Civil War was planned at Hopkins's summer estate, Clifton, where he had also entertained a number of foreign dignitaries, including the future King Edward VII. Hopkins was a strong supporter of the Union, unlike some Marylanders, who sympathized with and often supported the South and the Confederacy. During the Civil War, Clifton became a frequent meeting place for local Union sympathizers, and federal officials.

Hopkins' support of Abraham Lincoln also often put him at odds with some of Maryland's most prominent people, including Supreme Court justice Roger B. Taney who continually opposed Lincoln's presidential decisions such as limiting habeas corpus and stationing Union Army troops in Maryland. In 1862, Hopkins wrote a letter to Lincoln requesting that he not heed the detractors' calls and continue to keep soldiers stationed in Maryland. Hopkins also pledged financial and logistic support to Lincoln, in particular the free use of the B&O railway system.

== Abolitionism ==
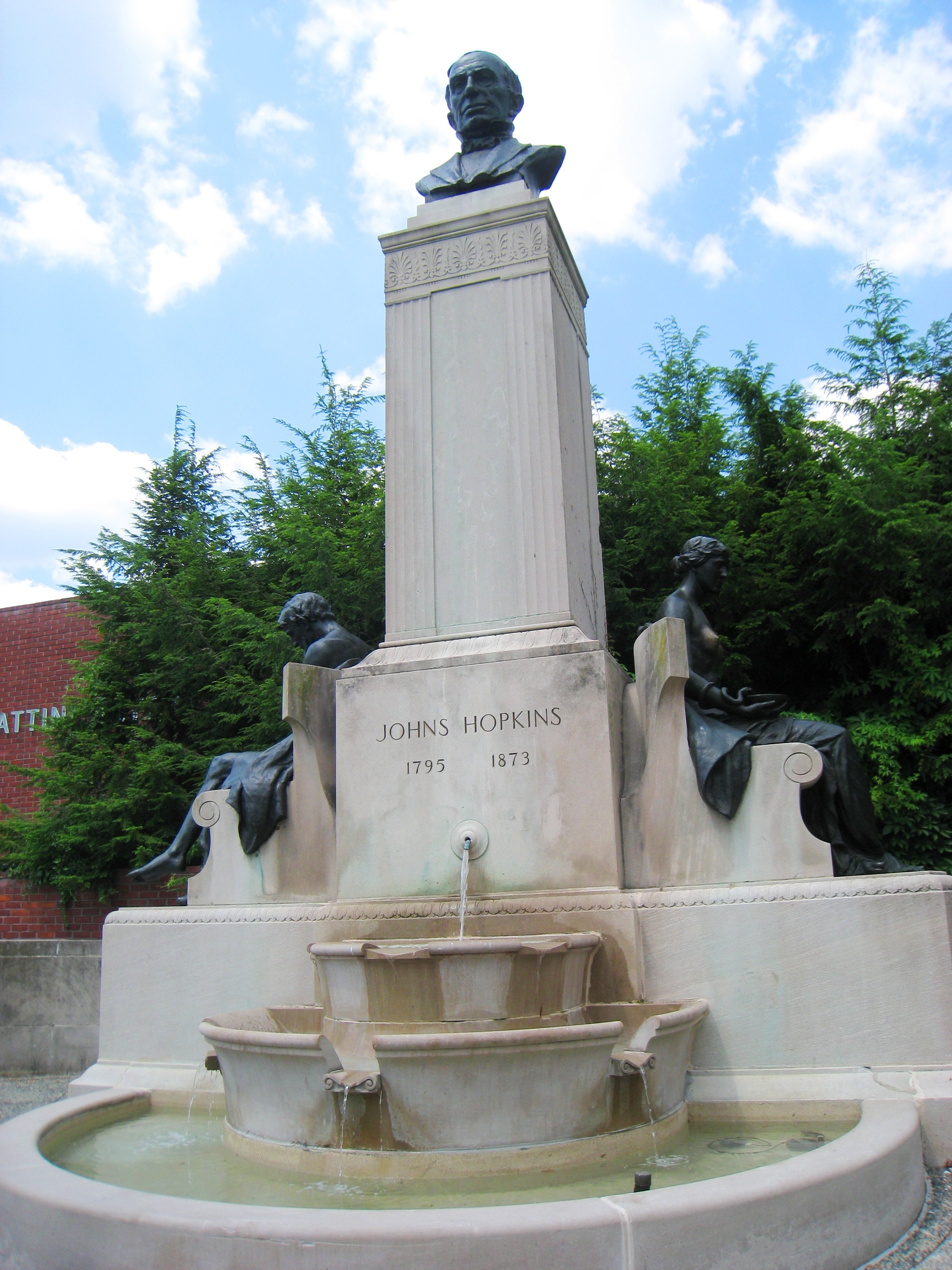
Johns Hopkins Monument at Johns Hopkins University in Baltimore

Hopkins's reputation as an abolitionist remains the subject of ongoing historical debate. In 2020, researchers affiliated with Johns Hopkins University, including historian Martha S. Jones, cited census records from 1840 and 1850 to claim that Hopkins owned enslaved individuals at his Baltimore residence and country estate. Their findings also emphasized the absence of documentary evidence confirming longstanding claims that Hopkins was an abolitionist, while noting his involvement in a regional economy shaped by slavery and his firm’s financial dealings involving enslaved people as collateral.

At the same time, the researchers identified sources indicating that Hopkins held antislavery political views, supported Abraham Lincoln and the Union, once purchased an enslaved person with the intention of securing their freedom, as well as contemporary praise from prominent Black leaders for his philanthropic support for Black communities.

Subsequent scholarship has challenged aspects of this interpretation while adding to evidence that Hopkins' held anti-slavery views. In a 2024 peer-reviewed article in the Maryland Historical Magazine, Sydney Van Morgan and three co-authors, including former Maryland state archivist Edward C. Papenfuse, argue that the 1850 census slave schedule does not constitute definitive evidence of slave ownership, citing the methodological limitations of the census and the lack of corroborating documentation such as tax records, wills, or bills of sale linking Hopkins directly to slaveholding. They propose several alternative explanations for the presence of enslaved individuals associated with Hopkins’s estate, including hired labor, temporary trusteeship arrangements connected to Quaker manumission practices, or possible errors in census enumeration.

Before the discovery of the census records, Johns Hopkins had been described as an "abolitionist before the word was even invented", having been represented as such both prior to the Civil War period, as well as during the Civil War and Reconstruction Era. Prior to the Civil War, Johns Hopkins worked closely with two of America's most famous abolitionists, Myrtilla Miner and Henry Ward Beecher. During the Civil War, Johns Hopkins, a staunch supporter of Lincoln and the Union, was instrumental in bringing Lincoln's emancipatory vision to fruition.

After the Civil War and during Reconstruction, Johns Hopkins's stance on abolitionism infuriated many prominent people in Baltimore. During Reconstruction and up to his death his abolitionism was expressed in the documents founding the Johns Hopkins Institutions and reported in newspaper articles before, during, and after the founding of these institutions. Before the war, there was significant written opposition to his support for Myrtilla Miner's founding of a school for African American females (now the University of the District of Columbia). In a letter to the editor, one subscriber to the widely circulated De Bow's Review wrote:

"It now seems that the Abolitionists not only propose to colonize Virginia from their own numbers, but that they are about to make the District of Columbia, in the midst of the slave region, and once under the jurisdiction of a slave State, the centre of an education movement, which shall embrace the free negroes of the whole North. A vast negro boarding school or college is proposed to be established in the City of Washington, the site for which has been purchased. The proposed edifice is designed to accommodate 150 scholars, and to furnish homes for the teachers and pupils from a distance ... The names of the Trustees ought to be mentioned particularly, as some of them are Southern men, and it might interest the South to know who they are..."

Similarly, opposition (and some support) was expressed during Reconstruction, such as in 1867, the same year he filed papers incorporating the Johns Hopkins Institutions, when he attempted unsuccessfully to stop the convening of the Maryland Constitutional Convention where the Democratic Party came into power and where a new state Constitution, the Constitution still in effect, was voted to replace the 1864 Constitution of the Republicans previously in power.

Apparent also in the literature of the times was opposition, and support for, the various other ways he expressed opposition to the racial practices that were beginning to emerge, and re-emerge as well, in the city of Baltimore, the state of Maryland, the nation, and in the posthumously constructed and founded institutions that would carry his name. A Baltimore American journalist praised Hopkins for founding three institutions, a university, a hospital, and an orphan asylum, specifically for colored children, adding that Hopkins was a "man (beyond his times) who knew no race" citing his provisions for both blacks and whites in the plans for his hospital. The reporter also pointed to similarities between Benjamin Franklin's and Johns Hopkins's views on hospital care and construction, such as their shared interest in free hospitals and the availability of emergency services without prejudice. This article, first published in 1870, also accompanied Hopkins's obituary in the Baltimore American as a tribute in 1873. Cited in many of the newspaper articles on him during his lifetime and immediately after his death were his provisions of scholarships for the poor, and quality health services for the under-served without regard to their age, sex, or color, the colored children asylum and other orphanages, and the mentally ill and convalescents.

== Philanthropy ==
Hopkins lived his entire adult life in Baltimore and made many friends among the city's social elite, many of them Quakers. One of these friends was George Peabody (b. 1795), who in 1857 founded the Peabody Institute in Baltimore. Examples of Hopkins's public giving were evident in Baltimore with public buildings, housing, free libraries, schools, and foundations constructed from his philanthropic giving. On the advice of Peabody, some believe, Hopkins determined to use his great wealth for the public good.

The Civil War and yellow fever and cholera epidemics took a great toll on Baltimore. In the summer of 1832 alone, the yellow fever and cholera epidemics killed 853 in Baltimore. Hopkins was keenly aware of the city's need for medical facilities in light of the medical advances made during the Civil War. In 1870, he made a will setting aside $7 million, (~$153 million in 2024) mostly in B&O stock, for the incorporation of a free hospital and affiliated medical and nurses' training colleges, an orphanage for Black children, and a university in Baltimore. The hospital and orphan asylum were overseen by a 12-member hospital board of trustees, and the university by a 12-member university board of trustees. Many board members were on both boards. In accordance with Hopkin's will, the Johns Hopkins Colored Children Orphan Asylum was founded in 1875; Johns Hopkins University was founded in 1876; the Johns Hopkins Press, the longest continuously operating academic press in the U.S., was founded in 1878; Johns Hopkins Hospital and Johns Hopkins School of Nursing were founded in 1889; the Johns Hopkins University School of Medicine was founded in 1893; and the Johns Hopkins School of Hygiene and Public Health was founded in 1916.

Hopkin's views on his bequests, and on the duties and responsibilities of the two boards of trustees, especially the hospital board of trustees led by his friend and fellow Quaker Francis T. King, were formally stated primarily in four documents, the incorporation papers filed in 1867, his instruction letter to the hospital trustees dated March 12, 1873, his will, which was quoted extensively in his Baltimore Sun obituary, and in his will's two codicils, one dated 1870 and a second dated 1873.

In these documents, Hopkins made provisions for scholarships to be provided for poor youths in the states where he had made his wealth and assistance to orphanages other than the one established for African American children, to members of his family, to those he employed, his cousin Elizabeth, to other institutions for the care and education of youths regardless of color, and the care of the elderly and the ill, including the mentally ill and convalescents.

John Rudolph Niernsee, one of the most notable architects of the time, designed the orphan asylum and helped to design the Johns Hopkins Hospital. The original site for Johns Hopkins University had been personally selected by Hopkins. According to his will, it was to be located at his summer estate, Clifton. However, a decision was made not to found the university there. The property, now owned by the city of Baltimore, is the site of a golf course and a park named Clifton Park. While Johns Hopkins Colored Children Orphan Asylum was founded by the hospital trustees, the other institutions that carry the name of Johns Hopkins were founded under the administration of Daniel Coit Gilman, the first president of Johns Hopkins University and Johns Hopkins Hospital, and Gilman's successors.

=== Colored Children Orphan Asylum ===
As stipulated in Hopkins's instruction letter, the Johns Hopkins Colored Children Orphan Asylum (JHCCOA) was founded first, in 1875, a year before Gilman's inauguration. The construction of the asylum, including its educational and living facilities, was praised by The Nation and the Baltimore American. The Baltimore American wrote that the orphan asylum was a place where "nothing was wanting that could benefit science and humanity". As was done for other Johns Hopkins institutions, it was planned after visits and correspondence with similar institutions in Europe and the U.S.

The Johns Hopkins Orphan Asylum opened with 24 boys and girls. Under Gilman and his successors, the orphanage was later changed to serve as an orphanage and training school for Black female orphans principally as domestic workers and as an orthopedic convalescent home and school for "colored crippled" children and orphans. The asylum was eventually closed in 1924 nearly 50 years after it opened.

=== Hospital, university, press, and schools of nursing and medicine ===
In accordance with Hopkins' March 1873 instruction letter, the school of nursing was founded alongside the hospital in 1889 by the hospital board of trustees in consultation with Florence Nightingale. Both the nursing school and the hospital were founded over a decade after the founding of the orphan asylum in 1875 and the university in 1876. Hopkins's instruction letter explicitly stated his vision for the hospital; first, to provide assistance to the poor of "all races", no matter the indigent patient's "age, sex or color"; second, that wealthier patients would pay for services and thereby subsidize the care provided to the indigent; third, that the hospital would be the administrative unit for the orphan asylum for African American children, which was to receive $25,000 in annual support out of the hospital's half of the endowment; and fourth, that the hospital and orphan asylum should serve 400 patients and 400 children respectively; fifth, that the hospital should be part of the university, and, sixth, that religion but not sectarianism should be an influence in the hospital.

By the end of Gilman's presidency, Johns Hopkins University, Johns Hopkins Press, Johns Hopkins Hospital and Johns Hopkins School of Nursing, and Johns Hopkins School of Medicine, and Johns Hopkins Colored Children Orphan Asylum had been founded; the last by the trustees, and the others in the order listed under the Gilman administration. "Sex" and "color" were major issues in the early history of the Johns Hopkins Institutions. The founding of the school of nursing is usually linked to Johns Hopkins's statements in his March 1873 instruction letter to the trustees that: "I desire you to establish, in connection with the hospital, a training school for female nurses. This provision will secure the services of women competent to care for those sick in the hospital wards, and will enable you to benefit the whole community by supplying it with a class of trained and experienced nurses".

== Legacy ==
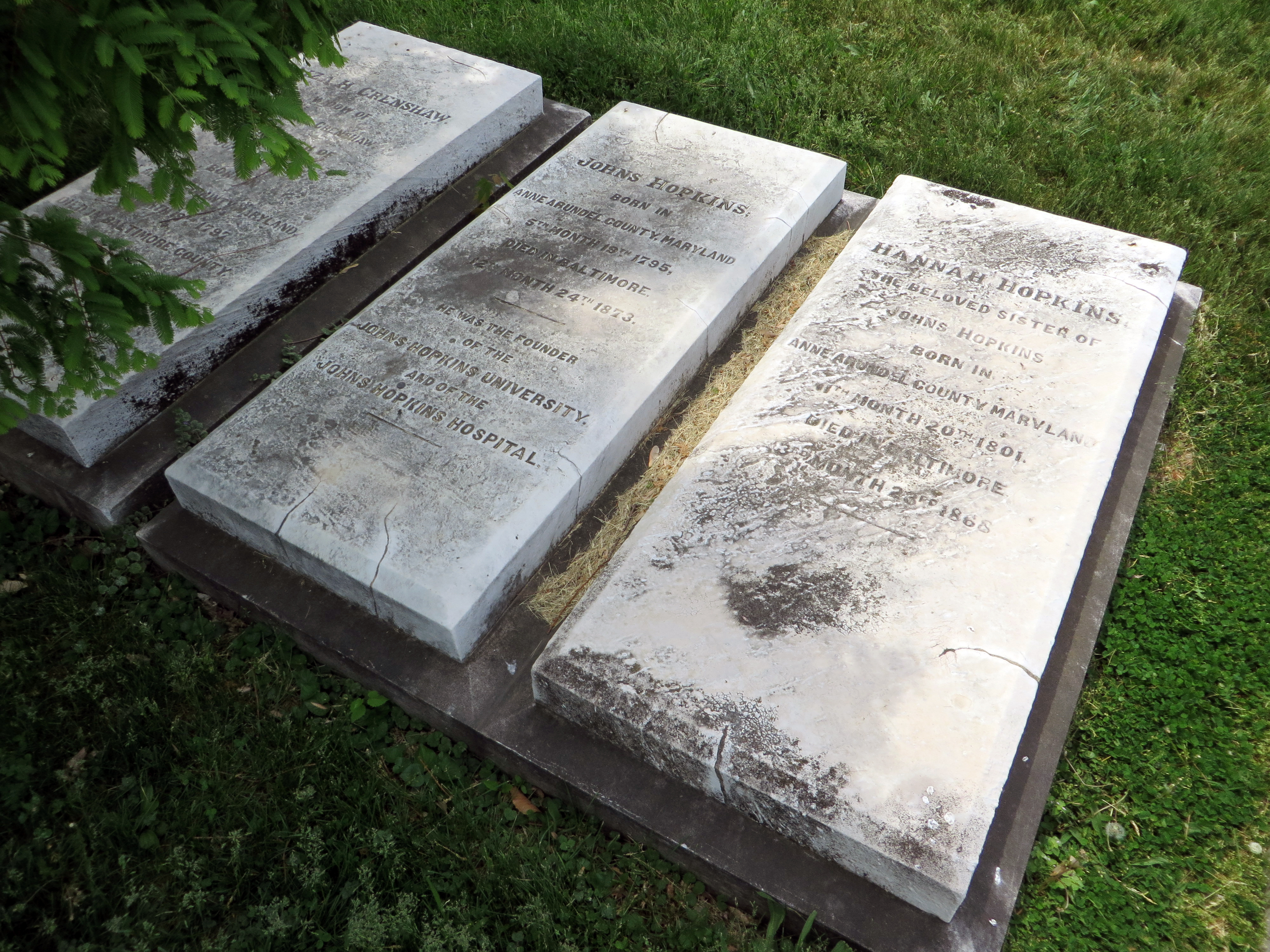
Hopkins' gravestone (center) in Green Mount Cemetery

Hopkins died on December 24, 1873, in Baltimore.

Following Hopkins's death, The Baltimore Sun published a lengthy obituary that reported, "In the death of Johns Hopkins a career has been closed which affords a rare example of successful energy in individual accumulations, and of practical beneficence in devoting the gains thus acquired to the public." Hopkins' contribution to the founding of Johns Hopkins University become his greatest legacy and was the largest philanthropic bequest ever made to a U.S. educational institution.

Hopkins' Quaker faith and early life experiences, including the 1778 emancipation, had a lasting influence on him throughout his life. Beginning early in his life, Hopkins looked upon his wealth as a trust to benefit future generations. He told his gardener that, "Like the man in the parable, I have had many talents given to me and I feel they are in trust. I shall not bury them but give them to the lads who long for a wider education". His philosophy quietly anticipated Andrew Carnegie's much-publicized Gospel of Wealth by more than 25 years.

The World War II Liberty Ship SS Johns Hopkins was named in his honor.

In 1973, Johns Hopkins was cited prominently in the Pulitzer Prize-winning book The Americans: The Democratic Experience by Daniel Boorstin, the Librarian of Congress from 1975 to 1987. From November 14, 1975, to September 6, 1976, a portrait of Hopkins was displayed at the National Portrait Gallery in an exhibit on the democratization of America based on Boorstin's book. In 1989, the United States Postal Service issued a $1 postage stamp in Hopkins' honor, as part of the Great Americans series.
