= Wyoming House for Historic Women =

Coordinates: 41°18′37.4″N 105°35′40.3″W

The Wyoming House For Historic Women, also known as Wyoming Women's History House is a museum in downtown Laramie, Wyoming, United States, which celebrates the achievements of 13 women from the state of Wyoming. It was established by the Louisa Swain Foundation, which honors Louisa Swain, the first woman in the United States to vote in a general election. She cast her ballot on September 6, 1870, in Laramie, Wyoming. The museum opened in 2012. The Wyoming State Historical Society says Swain was "the first woman in the world to cast a ballot under laws giving women and men equal voting rights".

The Johnson Lummis Hunkins Plaza is outside the Wyoming House for Historic Women. A statue of Louisa Swain in her honor was dedicated in the Johnson Lummis Hunkins Plaza in 2005. The statue is called "The Franchise", and was created by John D. Baker.

== The women ==
The women who form the subject matter of the museum are:

- Louisa Gardner Swain, first woman in the United States to vote in a general election, 1870
- Eliza Stewart, first woman in America selected to serve on a jury, 1870
- Martha Symons Boies Atkinson, first female bailiff in the United States, 1870
- Lynne Cheney, wife of Vice President Dick Cheney
- Barbara Cubin, first woman to represent Wyoming in Congress, starting in 1995
- Verda James, first woman to serve a full term as the Speaker of the Wyoming House of Representatives
- Marilyn S. Kite, first female Chief Justice on the Wyoming Supreme Court, chosen in 2010
- April Brimmer Kunz, first female President of the Wyoming Senate, starting in 2003 and ending in 2005
- All Woman Council of Jackson, an all-woman city government (including town council and mayor, who in turn appointed women to town marshal, town clerk and treasurer), elected in 1920
- Anna Edith Miller, first woman licensed as a nurse in Wyoming, licensed in 1909
- Esther Hobart Morris, first female justice of the peace in the United States, 1870
- Estelle Reel, first woman elected to Wyoming public office, as the State Superintendent of Public Instruction, elected in 1895
- Nellie Tayloe Ross, Governor and first female Director of the U.S. Mint
