= Louisa Swain =

First American woman to vote in a general election

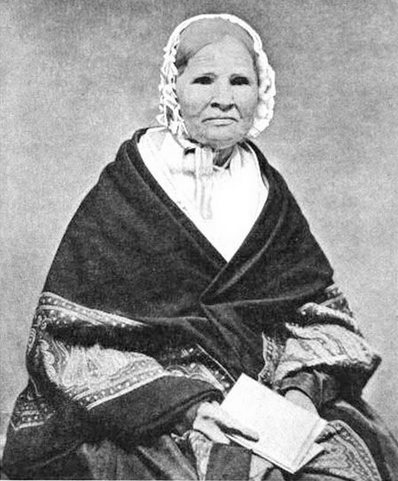
- Born: Louisa Ann Gardner; 1801; Charleston, South Carolina, U.S.
- Died: January 25, 1880 (aged 78–79); Lutherville, Maryland, U.S.
- Burial place: Friends Burial Ground, Baltimore, Maryland
- Monuments: Statue in front of the Wyoming House for Historic Women
- Known for: First woman to vote in a United States general election

Louisa Ann Swain (née Gardner; 1801 – January 25, 1880) was the first woman in the United States to vote in a general election after the repeal of women's suffrage in New Jersey in 1807. She cast her ballot on September 6, 1870, in Laramie, Wyoming.

== Biography ==
Born Louisa Ann Gardner, her father was lost at sea when she was 7 years old. Her mother then returned to her hometown of Charleston, South Carolina, but also died soon after. Orphaned at the age of 10, she was placed in the care of the Charleston Orphan House. In 1814, she and another girl were placed with a family as domestic servants for four years, after which she was transferred to another family who specifically requested her. She stayed with them until 1820, then moved to Baltimore where a year later, she married Stephen Swain, who operated a chair factory. They had four children, and in the 1830s, Stephen sold his business, and the family moved, first to Zanesville, Ohio, and later to Richmond, Indiana. In 1869, the Swains moved to Laramie, Wyoming, to join their son Alfred.

=== Voting ===
Stories differ on Swain's movements on September 6, 1870, before she voted in that year's primary election. A widely-circulated story is that she arose early, put on her apron, shawl and bonnet, and walked downtown with a tin pail to purchase yeast from a merchant. In 1919, The Meeteetse News reported that Swain was on her way to buy groceries. Another story is that Swain was allowed to vote first among a group of women that were at the polling place by being the oldest. What is known for certain is that she voted at the poll place that day. The previous year, the Wyoming Territorial Legislature wrote female suffrage into its constitution. She was described by a Laramie newspaper as "a gentle white-haired housewife, Quakerish in appearance". Judge M.C. Brown, the first mayor of Laramie, personally witnessed Swain voting. Historians state that Swain voted only 30 minutes before Augusta C. Howe, the 27 year old wife of the U.S. Marshall Church Howe. 92 other women in Wyoming voted that day.

She was 69 years old when she cast the first ballot by any woman in the United States in a general election. Soon after the election, Stephen and Louisa Swain left Laramie and returned to Maryland to live near one of her daughters. Stephen died October 6, 1872, in Maryland. Louisa died January 25, 1880, in Lutherville, Maryland. She was buried in the Friends Burial Ground on Harford Road in Baltimore.

== Legacy ==
Statue of Louisa Swain in Laramie, Wyoming

The Louisa Swain Foundation was established in 2001 (as the Laramie Foundation) and is dedicated to preserving and celebrating Swain's heritage and history and "fostering education in the areas of democracy, human rights and suffrage". The Foundation runs the Wyoming House for Historic Women (also known as the Wyoming Women's History House) in Laramie, Wyoming, which celebrates thirteen women, including Swain. A statue of her in her honor was dedicated in front of the museum in 2005.

Congress recognized September 6, 2008, as Louisa Swain Day via House Concurrent Resolution 378.

In 2022, Congress named the federal office building at 308 W. 21st Street in Cheyenne, Wyoming, the Louisa Swain Federal Office Building.
