= Delphinbrunnen (Munich) =

Coordinates: 48.144528°N 11.559806°E

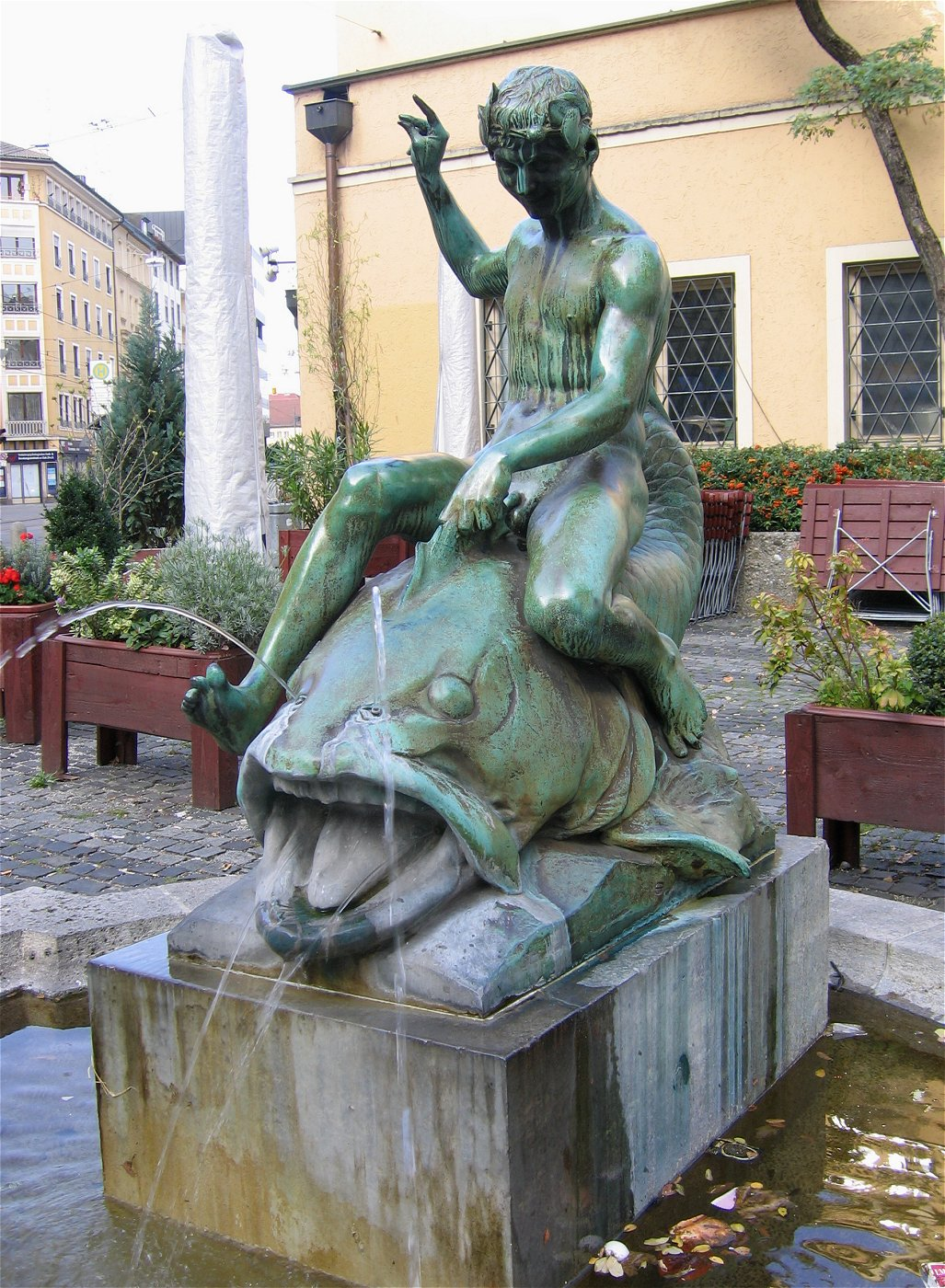
Delfinbrunnen (1902), Arthur Storch's fountain in Maxvorstadt, Munich

Delphinbrunnen ("Dolphin Fountain"), a 1902 bronze by Arthur Storch, is located in Maxvorstadt, Munich, Bavaria, Germany.
