= Francis T. King =

American merchant and Quaker (1819–1891)

Francis Thompson King (February 25, 1819 – December 18, 1891) was a nineteenth-century Baltimore merchant, a prominent American Quaker, and a founding member of the Johns Hopkins University and Johns Hopkins Hospital inaugural board of trustees.

== Early life and education ==
Born in Baltimore on February 25, 1819, King was the eldest of five children of Joseph King Jr. and Tacey Ellicott King. He began his education at St. Mary's College in Baltimore before transferring to Haverford College in 1833, following its establishment by Orthodox Quakers. He was among those in the first graduating class of 1835.

In 1846, King married Elizabeth Green Taber, and together they had three children, Mary, Annie and Bessie King.

Upon returning to Baltimore from college, King pursued a career in commerce, initially working as a clerk for the dry goods firm Janney, Hopkins, and Hull before establishing his own company, King, Carey, and Howe. Over time, he accumulated considerable wealth, and following his retirement, he dedicated most of his time to religious and philanthropic endeavors.

== Activities ==
A committed emancipationist, King engaged in early efforts to oppose slavery, including raising funds to purchase and free enslaved individuals. Reflecting on his actions, he later noted, "I bought several slaves after I grew to manhood—once a mother and her young children—freed them, never however taking the title myself. I risked the illegality of the act rather than recognize the right of any man to hold a fellow human being as property."

King was actively involved in numerous philanthropic and educational organizations. He served as president of the Maryland Bible Society and was the founding president of the Thomas Wilson Sanitarium for the care of sick children. Additionally, he was the president of the Board of Trustees of Bryn Mawr College and held directorial positions in various other charitable organizations, banks, and insurance companies.

Deeply devoted to Quaker principles, King served as clerk of both the Baltimore Monthly Meeting and Baltimore Yearly Meeting. He was notably influenced by the English Quaker Joseph John Gurney, whom he met during Gurney's visit to Baltimore in the late 1830s. King frequently hosted visiting Friends from abroad, reinforcing his role as a “weighty Quaker” in the Society of Friends.

During the Civil War, King led a delegation to Washington, D.C., to lobby Secretary of War Edwin Stanton for the exemption of Quakers from military service. He also secured a pass from President Abraham Lincoln, allowing him to travel through Confederate territory without detention.

Following the war, King played a significant role in Reconstruction efforts. As the founding president of the Association of Friends to Advise and Assist the Friends in the Southern States, he worked to support Southern Quakers and newly emancipated African Americans. He personally traveled to North Carolina to assess the war-related devastation and advocated for the expansions of educational opportunities for Black communities there. In recognition of his contributions, King Hall at Guilford College was named in his honor.

In 1867, Johns Hopkins selected King to serve as a trustee of his charities—the Johns Hopkins University, Johns Hopkins Hospital, and Johns Hopkins Colored Orphans Asylum—and named him one of three executors of his will. King later became the hospital's first president. In 1881, as part of his efforts to recruit faculty and staff for the newly established institutions, he traveled to Europe, where he met with Florence Nightingale to discuss nursing education and training.

== Death ==
Francis Thompson King died of pneumonia in Baltimore on December 18, 1891.
