= Arthur Storch (sculptor) =

German sculptor (1879-1947)

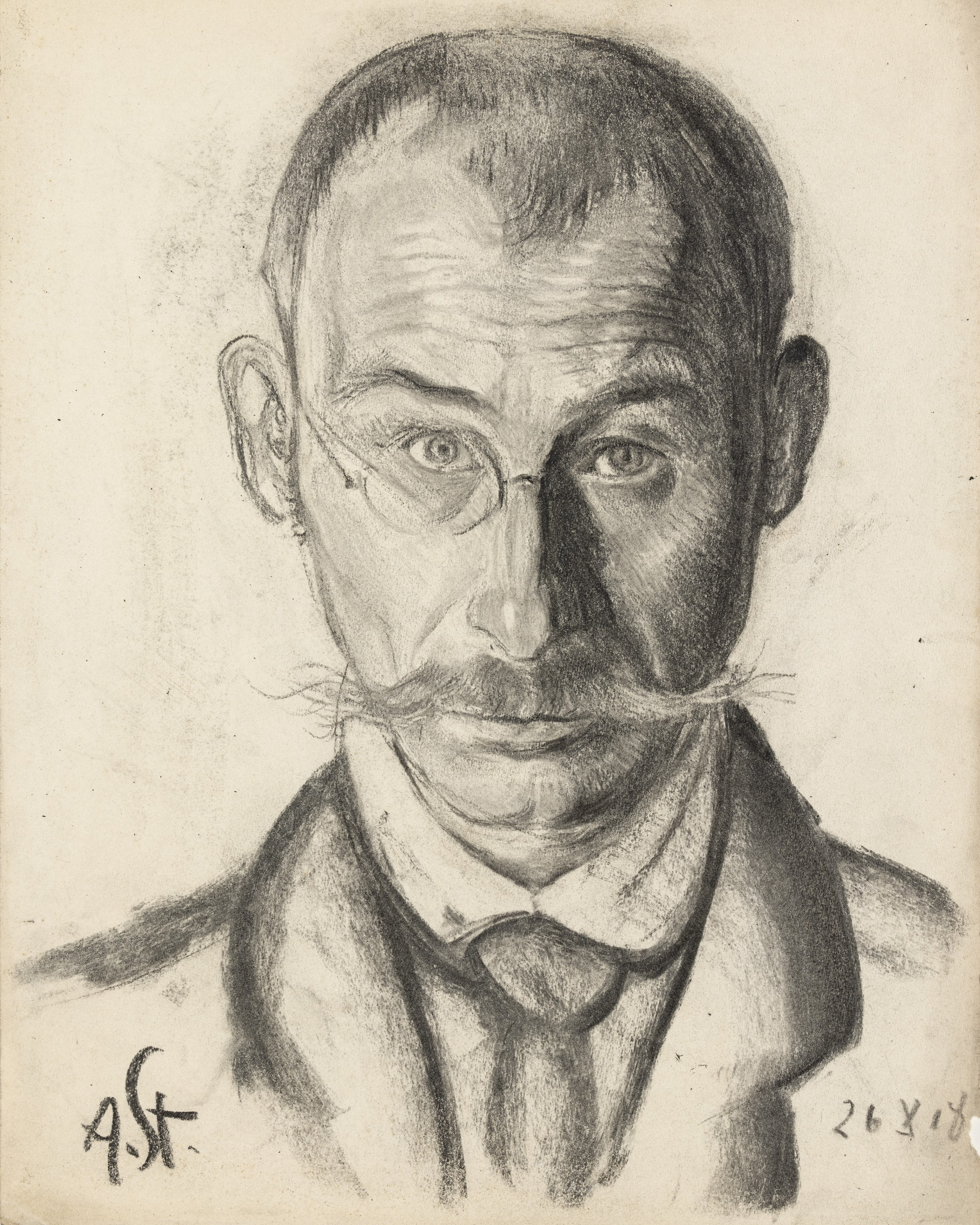
- self portrait in charcoal by the German sculptor and medallist Arthur Storch
- Born: 22 March 1870; Volkstedt
- Died: 9 March 1947 (aged 76); Rudolstadt
- Alma mater: Academy of Fine Arts, Munich
- Occupation: Sculptor, medalist, ceramist

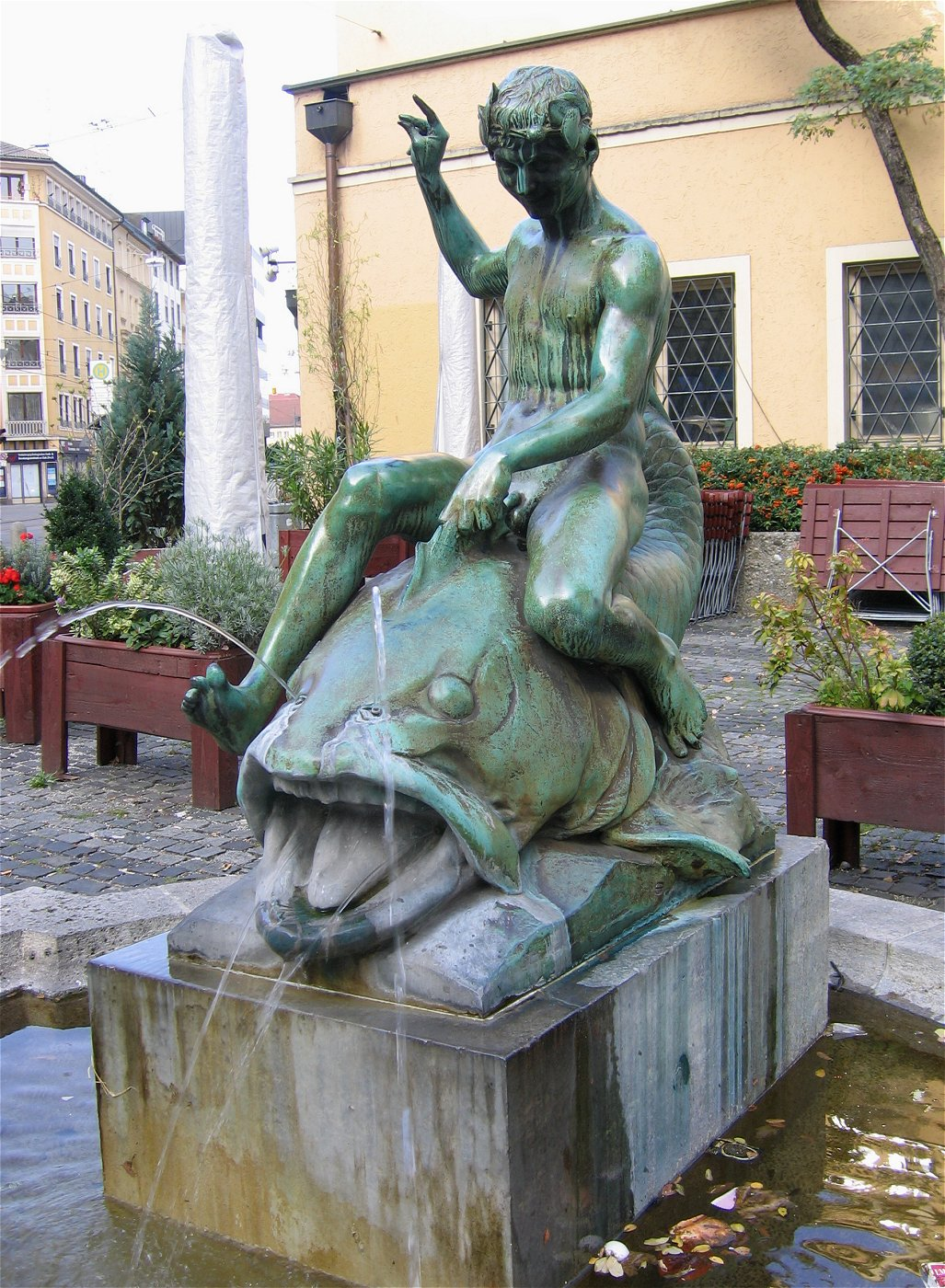
Delfinbrunnen (1906), Storch's fountain in Maxvorstadt, Munich

Arthur Josef Ernst Storch (1870–1947) was a German sculptor and medallist who worked in porcelain, stone and bronze.

== Early life ==
Arthur Storch was born on 22 March 1870 in Volkstedt, Rudolstadt, Germany, to a family of Thuringian porcelain artists, including his father Carl Hermann Storch, a modeller and painter, and mother Caroline Florentine, née Leuthäuser. He had a twin brother Hugo and younger siblings Max and Anna.

== Career ==
From 1886 to 1888, Storch completed an apprenticeship as a model maker at the porcelain company Triebner, Ens & Eckert. In 1891, he received the "great silver medal" of the Königlichen Akademie der Künste for an exhibition of student work. From 1894 to 1902, he studied under Wilhelm von Rümann at the Munich Art Academy, where he subsequently worked. From 1902 he worked as a freelance in Munich. Between 1905 and 1907 he provided stucco decoration for the ceilings of the Kurhaus, Wiesbaden.

In 1911 he designed a series of eleven medals depicting animals, for the opening of Munich Zoological Garden. The same year he moved to Hamburg, where he became a member of the Hamburger Künstlerverein von 1832 (Hamburg Artists' Association of 1832).

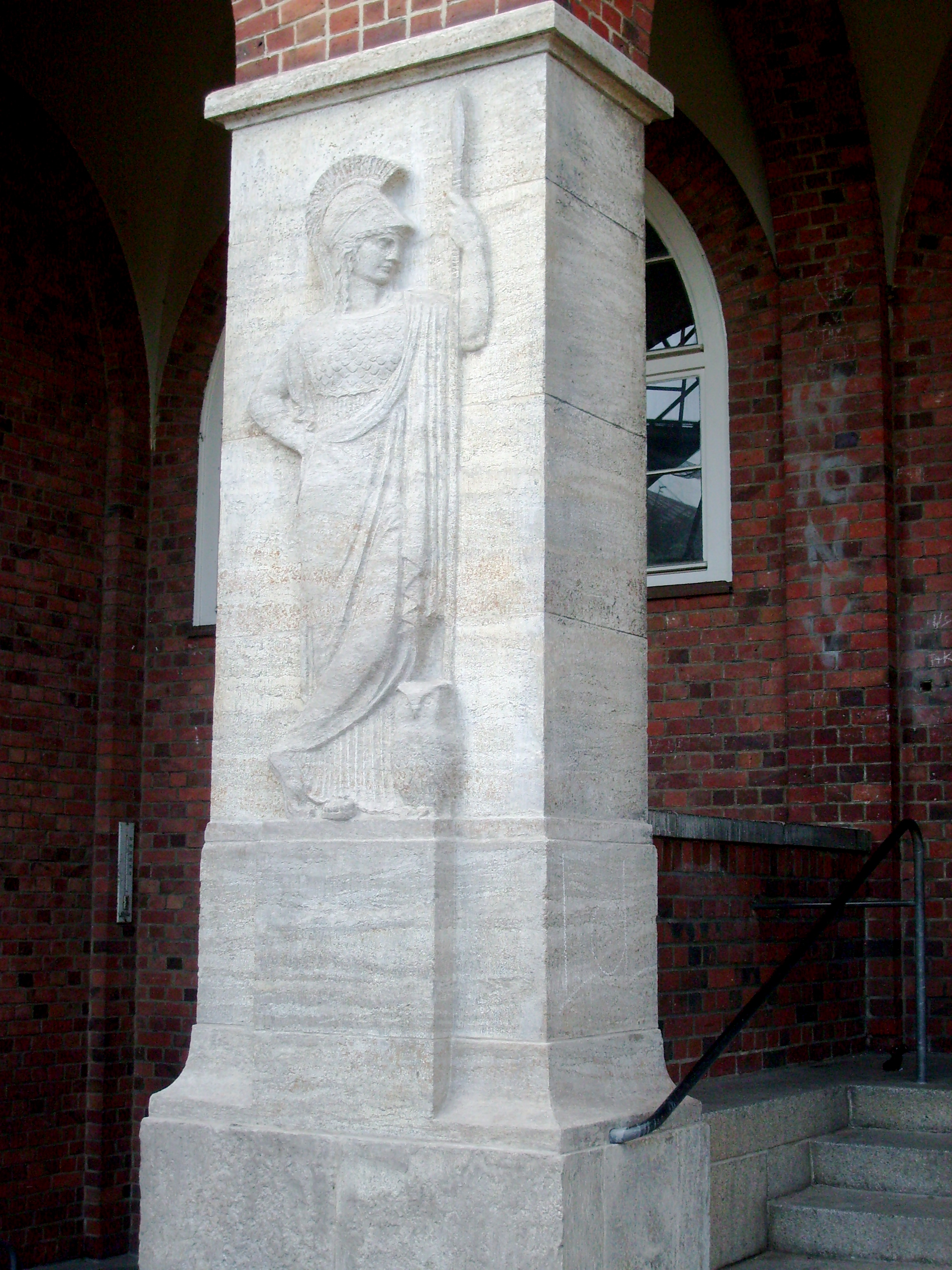
Relief of Athena (1914), Hansa-Gymnasium, Hamburg-Bergedorf

The Hansa-Gymnasium in Hamburg-Bergedorf has a series of sculptures by Storch, made in 1914. Facade figures below the mansard roof depict four larger-than-life ancient philosophers: Socrates, Demosthenes, Cicero and Ovid. Storch also created a figure of Athena in bas-relief on the pillar at the main entrance, and a fountain with a fox figure. This work was one of several commissions he was given by the municipal architect, Fritz Schumacher.

He exhibited four animal figures at the Große Deutsche Kunstausstellung (Great German Art Exhibition) in Munich in 1937 and 1938. In 1937, Adolf Hitler purchased his bronze sculpture Horse.

== Personal life ==
Storch married Emilie Therese Anna, née Müller, at Rudolstadt in 1903. Their children were sons Hermann (1899) and Franz (1904) and daughters Elsa (1905) and Lona (1908).

In 1917 he moved his family back to Volkstedt.

== Death and legacy ==
Storch died on 9 March 1947 in Rudolstadt and was buried in the cemetery at Volkstedt.

His porcelain sculpture Wild Forest Creature (Mandrill Monkey), depicting a Mandrill, was one of a set of sixteen of pieces he made for the Porzellanpalais Leipzig at the 1921 Leipzig Fair; an example is in the Lightner Museum in Florida. Other works are in the Staatsgalerie Moderne Kunst in Munich, Kunsthalle Mannheim, Hamburger Kunsthalle and the Grassi Museum, Leipzig.

In 2022, Thüringer Landesmuseums Heidecksburg held an exhibition of his works, marking the 75th anniversary of his death, and published an accompanying book.
