= Helena Willman-Grabowska =

Polish indologist

Helena Willman-Grabowska (4 January 1870 in Warsaw – 31 October 1957 in Kraków) was a Polish indologist. A lecturer at the Sorbonne, she was also one of the first female professors at Jagiellonian University. She is best remembered for her publications Les composés nominaux dàns le Śatapathabrāhmana (1927–28), Le chien dans le Rigveda et l'Avesta (1931), L'idée de l'etat dans l'Inde ancienne (1933), and Expiacja (prāyaścitti) in Brāhman (1935).
