= Jelica Belović-Bernadzikowska =

Croatian ethnographer, journalist, writer, and feminist

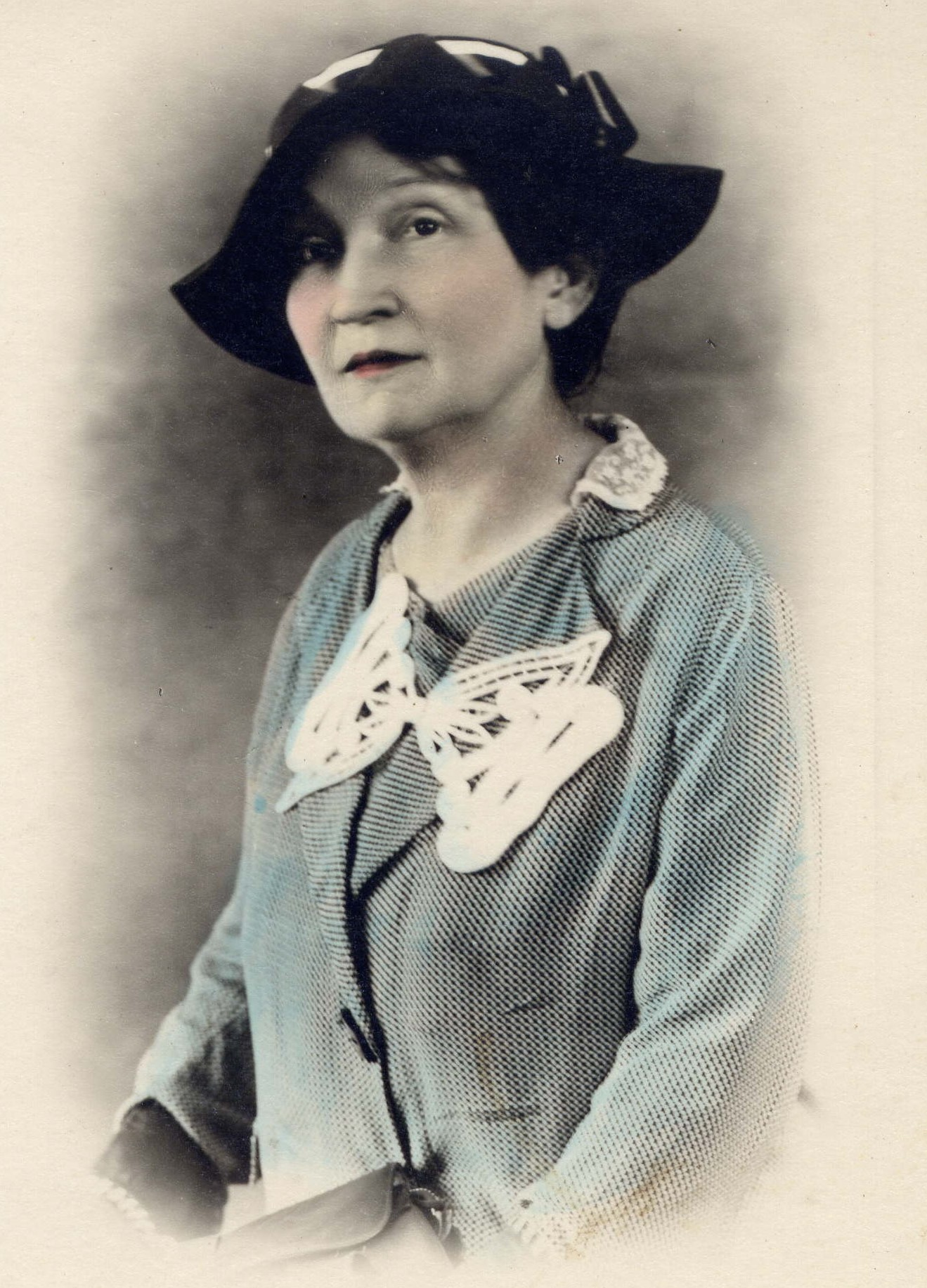
- Born: Jelica Belović; 25 February 1870; Osijek, Kingdom of Croatia-Slavonia, Austria-Hungary
- Died: 30 June 1946 (aged 76); Novi Sad, PR Serbia, FPR Yugoslavia
- Occupations: writer, feminist, teacher
- Spouse: Janko Bernadzikowski (m. 1896, unknown)
- Parents: Josip Belović; Katenina Fragner

Jelica Belović-Bernadzikowska (25 February 1870 – 30 June 1946) was a Croatian ethnographer, journalist, writer, and feminist. She wrote literary works for children and educational discussions. As a journalist, wrote theater and music criticism, and published works on handicrafts and folk costumes. She wrote for and was the editor of the first Serbian women's magazine. She wrote under multiple pseudonyms, including Ljuba T. Daničić, Hele, Jelica, Jele, Jasna, Aunt Jelica, and young lady Ana.

== Biography ==
Jelica Belović was born on 25 February 1870 in Osijek, Austria-Hungary to a Serbian father Josip Belović and German mother Katenina Fragner. From childhood, she learned Serbian, French, German and Italian from her parents, who were both teachers. When her father died, she was five years old and her mother tutored to provide for the family. Belović attended primary school in Osijek and then studied at a secondary school in Đakovo. She also studied at the Institute of Josip Juraj Strossmayer before attending the Convent of Mercy School, where she first began to study and collect handicrafts. Belović went on to complete her education at the Teacher Training College of Mercy in Zagreb and at the College of Education in Vienna and Paris. In 1891, after her higher studies, she began teaching in Zagreb.

== Career ==
For two years, Belović taught in Ruma and Osijek, and began writing pedagogical essays. Her writing caught the attention of Ljuboje Dlustuš, regional Secretary for Education, who offered her a teaching position in Bosnia-Herzegovina in 1893. Though technically a part of the Ottoman Empire, the area had become an occupied territory of the Austro-Hungarian Empire with the signing of the Treaty of Berlin in 1878. Belović began teaching at the girls' school in Mostar, where she met Janko Bernadzikowski, a Polish civil servant. They married in February 1896 and she subsequently had two children, Vladimir and Jasna. Bernadžikowski was appointed to a position in Sarajevo and the couple relocated. Belović-Bernadzikowska taught at the girls' school in Sarajevo, but was transferred in 1898 to the girls' gymnasium in Banja Luka, when she refused the advances of her mentor. She became an administrator of the school, but increasingly had differences of opinion with her superiors, as she drifted away from their pro-Austrian policies and developed an empathy for the Serbs she was living among and teaching. She learned to write in the Cyrillic script and published in Serbian magazines. In 1900, Belović-Bernadzikowska was dismissed from her teaching post.

She continued to write, and traveled frequently to collect folk tales and craft work. During this period, she published works in Serbian such as Пољско цвеће (Wild flowers, Sarajevo 1899), Разговор цвијећа (Talk of Flowers, 1901) and Хрватски народни везови (Croatian folk embroideries, 1906). Having experienced inequality, she was also keenly interested in improving the cultural and social standing of women. She wrote numerous articles about the changing realities for women and published such pieces as "Žena Budućnosti" (Women of the Future) and "Moderne Žene" (Modern Women) both which appeared in the 1899 edition of the journal Zora (Dawn). Between 1904 and 1913, she worked with Friedrich Salomon Krauss, using the pseudonym Ljuba T. Daničić, in his noted yearbooks Antropofiteja, which collected information on the social and sexual lives of rural southern Slavs. She was said to be very outspoken and when she was banned from publishing under one name, Belović-Bernadzikowska used another. Among the names she is known to have published under are Hele, Jelica, Jele, Jasna, Aunt Jelica, young lady Ana, Ljuba T. Daničić and Jasna Belović. She spoke nine languages and though most of her works were published in Serbian, she also published in German.

In 1907, she was invited by the provincial government of Zagreb to assist them with their ethnographic collections for the National Museum of Art and Trade. Belović-Bernadzikowska created a catalog of textiles for the Museum of Arts and Crafts in Zagreb and an ethnographic catalog for the Sbírka Commerce Crafts Museum in Zagreb. She published articles about textiles and handicrafts in many journals throughout Europe, including "Anthropophytea", "Journal of the Gipsy Lore Society", "Revue des Deux Mondes", and other learned publications. She also exhibited embroidery and folk costumes in at venues in Berlin, Dresden, Munich, Paris and Vienna, collaborating with other experts. In 1910 Belović-Bernadzikowska exhibited at the Prague exhibition of Serb women, with a display of Bosnia-Herzegovinian textiles. At the meeting, she was inspired to create a women's almanac. The journal, Srpkinja (Serbian Woman), published in Sarajevo, was the first almanac written by Serb women for Serb women. Founded in 1913, Belović-Bernadzikowska edited the volume and wrote serialized articles for it.

When the First World War broke out in 1914, Belović-Bernadzikowska left Sarajevo, returning to Osijek, where she remained until 1917. Around the same time, her marriage fell apart due to infidelity and syphilis, leading her to increase her feminist activity. She returned to Sarajevo in 1918 and became the editor of the newspaper Народна снага (People's power). Later that year, she was hired to teach at the co-ed school in Novi Sad, which that same year became part of the Kingdom of Serbs, Croats and Slovenes. She taught in Novi Sad until her retirement in 1936. Though her publishing efforts slowed, during her lifetime, Belović-Bernadzikowska published over 40 manuscripts and books. She died on 30 June 1946 in Novi Sad, Serbia

== Selected works ==
- Беловић Бернаджиковска, Јелица (1890). Сто и десет народних игара [One hundred and ten folk dances] (in Serbo-Croatian). Zagreb, Croatia.
- Беловић Бернаджиковска, Јелица (1896). Искрице из свјетске књижевности [Sparks from world literature] (in Serbo-Croatian). Serbia.
- Беловић Бернаджиковска, Јелица (1898). Грађа за технолошки рјечник женског ручног рада [Materials for a technological dictionary of female manual labor] (in Serbo-Croatian). Sarajevo, Bosnia and Herzegovina: Zemaljska štamparija.
- Беловић Бернаджиковска, Јелица (1899). Пољско цвеће-збирка народних приповедака [Wild flowers-a collection of folk tales] (in Serbo-Croatian). Sarajevo, Bosnia and Herzegovina.
- Беловић Бернаджиковска, Јелица (1899). Дечија психологија данашњег времена [Children's psychology of our time] (in Serbo-Croatian). Serbia.
- Беловић Бернаджиковска, Јелица (1900). Из могa албума: психолошке фотографије [From my albums psychological photos] (in Serbo-Croatian). Sarajevo, Bosnia and Herzegovina: Zemaljska štamparija.
- Беловић Бернаджиковска, Јелица (1900). Меандери [Meandering] (in Serbo-Croatian). Zagreb, Croatia.
- Беловић Бернаджиковска, Јелица (1901). Разговор цвијећа [Talk of flowers] (in Serbo-Croatian). Zagreb, Croatia.
- Беловић Бернаджиковска, Јелица (1901). Сликање на дрвету, глини, камену, кожи и др [Painting on wood, clay, stone, skin and others] (in Serbo-Croatian). Zagreb, Croatia.
- Belović-Bernadzikovska, Jelica (1906). Hrvatska čitma [Croatian boot] (in Serbo-Croatian). Požega, Croatia: Hrvatska tiskara i knjižara. OCLC 443260650.
- Беловић Бернаджиковска, Јелица (1906). Хрватски народни везови [Croatian folk embroideries] (in Serbo-Croatian). Zagreb, Croatia.
- Belović-Bernadzikowska, Jelica (1906). Katalog narodopisne sbirke Trgovačko-obrtnog muzeja u Zagrebu [Ethnographic Catalog of the Sbírka Commerce Crafts Museum in Zagreb] (in Serbo-Croatian). Zagreb, Croatia: Nakladom Trgovačko-obrtnog muzeja.
- Беловић Бернаджиковска, Јелица (1906). Везилачка умјетност у Хрвата и Срба [Folklore art Croats and Serbs] (in Serbo-Croatian). Zagreb, Croatia.
- Беловић Бернаджиковска, Јелица (1907). Српски народни вез и текстилна орнаментика [Serbian folk embroidery and textile ornamentation] (in Serbo-Croatian). Novi Sad, Serbia: Матица Српска.
- Belović-Bernadzikovska, Jelica (1911). Мала везиља [Small embroiderers] (in Serbo-Croatian). Pula, Croatia: Tiskara Laginja. OCLC 444158316.
- Daničic, Ljuba T. (1911). Handtuch und Goldtüchein in Glauben, Brauch und Gewohnaitrecht der Slaven (in German). Leipzig, Germany: Ethnol Verlag. OCLC 320548042.
- Daničic, Ljuba T. (1912). Die Frauenschürze in Glauben und Sitten der Südslaven (in German). Leipzig, Germany: Ethnol Verlag. OCLC 320548043.
- Belović Bernadžikovska, Jelica (1913). Erotik und in der skatologia sudslavischen Kusche (in German). Novi Sad, Serbia.
- Belović Bernadžikovska, Jelica (1923). Mustik Gesang und bei den Sudslaven (in German). Novi Sad, Serbia.
- Belović Bernadžikovska, Jelica (1925). des Guslarenlied (in German). Novi Sad, Serbia.
- Belović, Jasna (1927). Die Sitten der Sudslaven (in German). Dresden, Germany: Paul Aretz Verlag.
- Belović Bernadzikovska, Jelica (1933). Jugoslovenski narodni vezovi [The Yugoslav National bindings] (in Serbo-Croatian). Novi Sad, Serbia: P-C-K. OCLC 25839366.
- Беловић Бернаджиковска, Јелица (1933). Аутобиографске белешке: Да ли је г Душан Јелкић мистификација? [Autobiographical notes: Was Mr Dušan Jelkić a mystification?] (in Serbo-Croatian). Novi Sad, Serbia: Матица Српска.
- Беловић Бернаджиковска, Јелица (1933). Народни вез [Traditional embroidery] (in Serbo-Croatian). Novi Sad, Serbia: Матица Српска.
- Belović Bernadzikovska, Jelica (1936). Pedeset godina života i rada. [Autobiografske beleške.] [Fifty years of life and work. [Autobiographical notes.]] (in Serbo-Croatian). Novi Sad, Serbia: Št. Brače Grujića. OCLC 444526058.
