= Frank King (English cricketer) =

English cricketer

Personal information
- Full name: Frank King
- Born: 6 April 1911; Lewisham, London, England
- Died: 1 November 1996 (aged 85); Sherborne, Dorset, England
- Batting: Right-handed
- Bowling: Right-arm fast-medium

Domestic team information
- Years: Team
- 1937–1954: Dorset
- 1934–1935: Cambridge University

Career statistics
Competition	First-class
Matches	10
Runs scored	68
Batting average	6.80
100s/50s	–/–
Top score	16*
Balls bowled	1,509
Wickets	22
Bowling average	27.95
5 wickets in innings	2
10 wickets in match	–
Best bowling	6/64
Catches/stumpings	7/–
- Source: Cricinfo, 21 November 2011

Frank King (6 April 1911 – 1 November 1996) was an English cricketer. King was a right-handed batsman who bowled right-arm fast-medium. He was born at Lewisham, London and educated at Dulwich College.

King made his first-class debut for Cambridge University against Northamptonshire in 1934. He made nine further first-class appearances for the university, the last of which came against the Free Foresters in 1935. In his ten first-class appearances, he scored 68 runs at an average of 6.80, with a high score of 16 not out. With the ball, he took 22 wickets at a bowling average of 27.95, with best figures of 6/64. These figures, which were one of two five wicket hauls he took, came against Worcestershire in 1934.

In 1937, King made his debut for Dorset in the Minor Counties Championship against Wiltshire. He played for Dorset after World War II, making a total of 49 Minor Counties Championship appearances from 1937 to 1954.

He died at Sherborne, Dorset on 1 November 1996.
