= Friends Burial Ground (Baltimore) =

- U.S. National Register of Historic Places
- Baltimore City Landmark
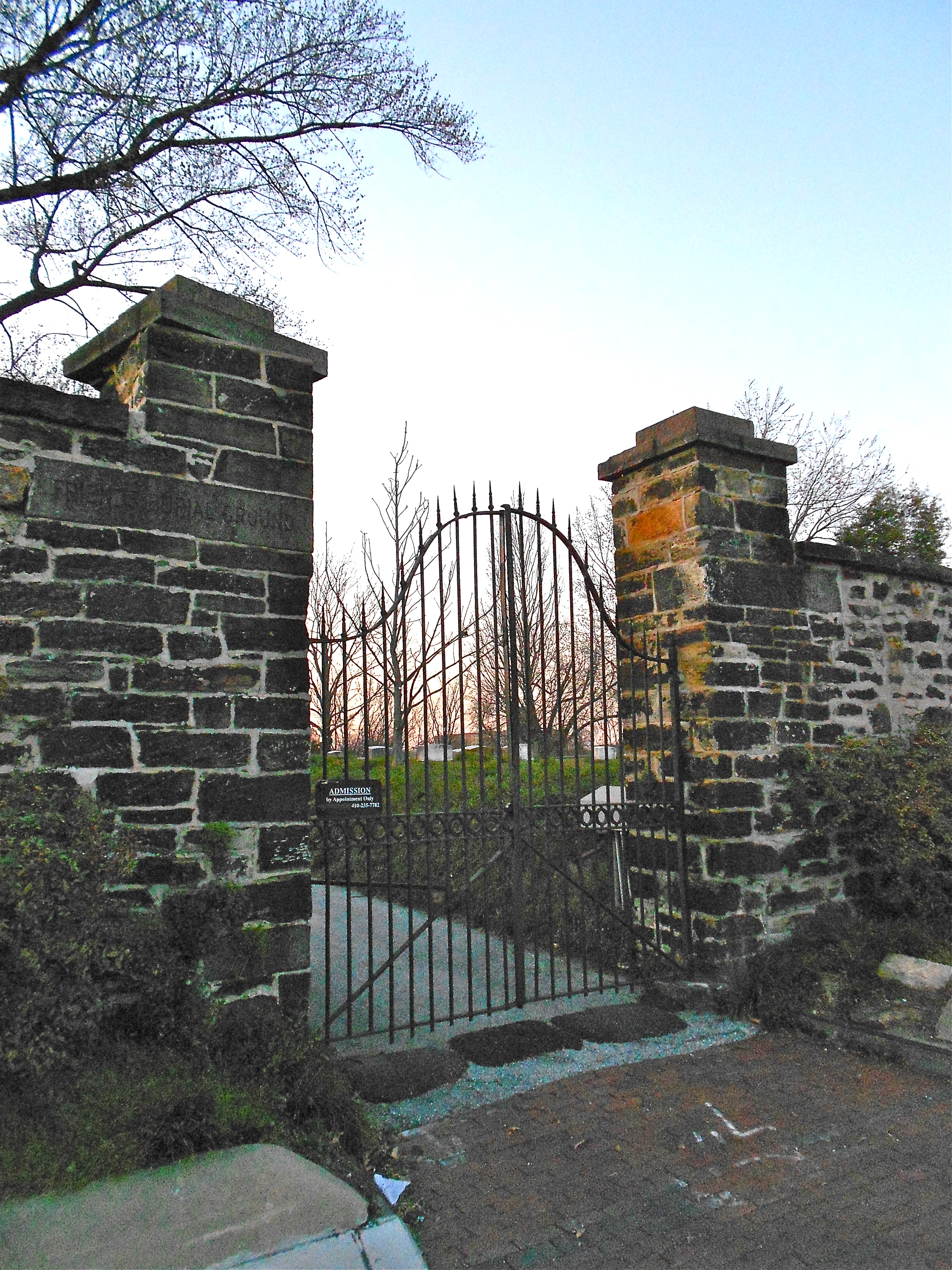
- Interactive map of Friends Burial Ground
- Location: 2506 Harford Rd., Baltimore, Maryland
- Coordinates: 39°19′5″N 76°35′42″W
- Area: 2.8 acres (1.1 ha)
- Built: 1713
- NRHP reference No.: 04001471

Significant dates
- Added to NRHP: January 12, 2005
- Designated BCL: 1999

Friends Burial Ground is a historic Quaker cemetery in Baltimore, Maryland, United States. It is the earliest cemetery in Baltimore, established in 1713, and 2.8 acres (11,000 m^{2}) in size. It contains a total of approximately 1,900 small, simple grave markers, arranged in compact rows interspersed with large trees. The graveyard is surrounded by a fieldstone wall 8 feet (2.4 m) high, built in the 1860s, now covered with moss, roses, and ivy.

Friends Burial Ground was added to the National Register of Historic Places in 2005.
