= Palaiyam railway station =

Railway station in Palaiyam, Tamil Nadu, India

Palaiyam

General information
- Location: Palaiyam, Tamil Nadu, India
- Coordinates: 10.7189°N 78.1291°E
- Elevation: 205 metres (673 ft)
- System: Indian Railways station
- Owner: Indian Railways
- Line: Salem–Karur–Dindigul line
- Platforms: 1
- Tracks: 1

Construction
- Structure type: On-ground

Other information
- Station code: PALM
- Zone(s): Southern Railway zone
- Division(s): Salem
- Fare zone: Southern Railway zone
Route map
Location
- Location within India Location within Tamil Nadu

Palaiyam railway station (station code: PALM) is an NSG–6 category Indian railway station in Salem railway division of Southern Railway zone. It is a railway junction serves Omalur and its surrounding areas in Salem, Tamil Nadu. This railway junction also serves as a satellite station for Salem Junction. All the trains halting/passing via Salem Junction from Bengaluru and Mettur stop at Omalur Junction. This station lies on the junction of lines to Bengaluru via Dharmapuri and Hosur and Mettur. It is a railway station situated in Palaiyam, Dindigul district in the Indian state of Tamil Nadu. The station is an intermediate station on the newly commissioned Salem Junction–Karur Junction line which became operational in May 2013. The station is operated by the Southern Railway zone of the Indian Railways and comes under the Salem railway division.
