= Company rule in India =

Period of Indian history (1757–1858)

India
- 1757–1858
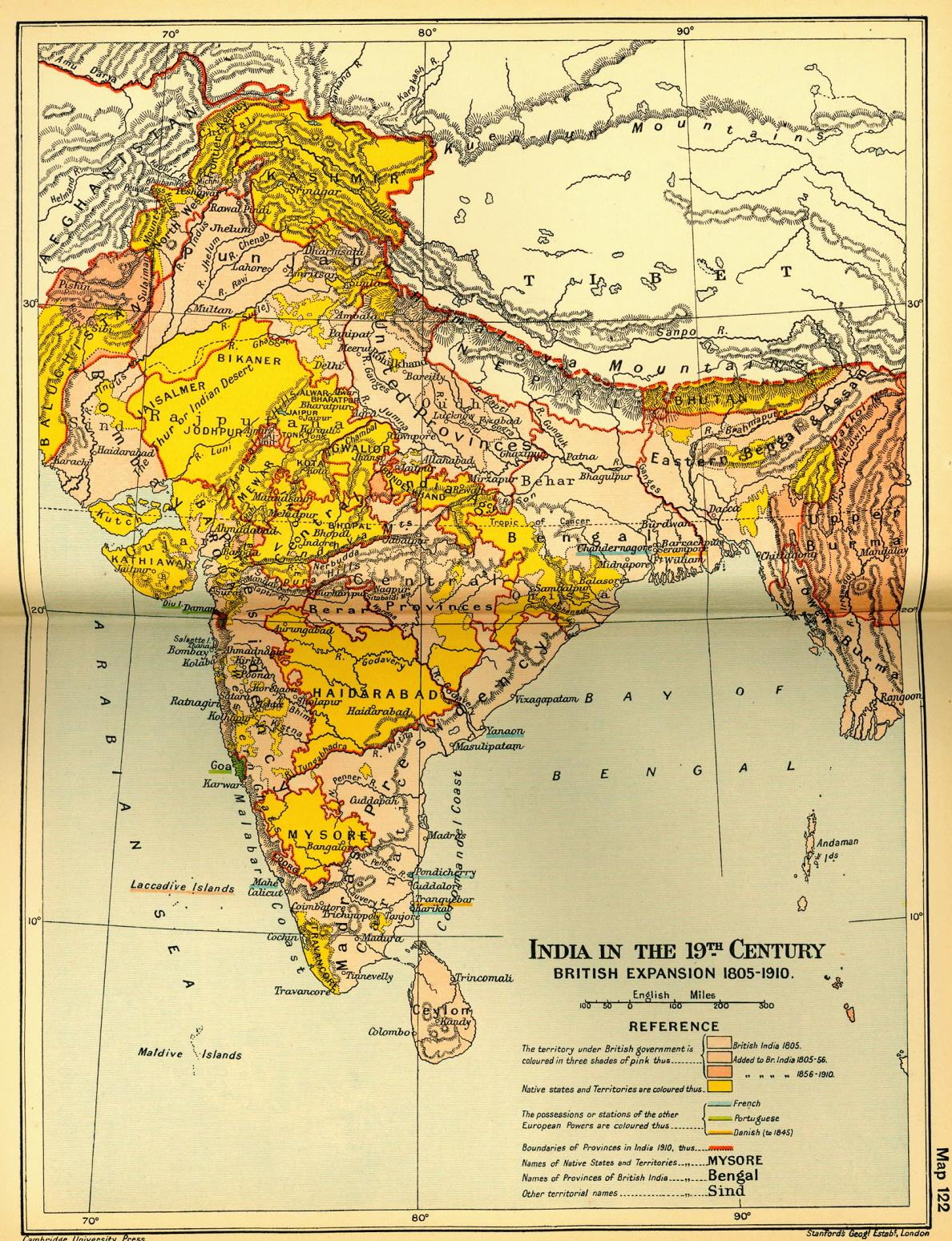
- Regions under Company rule shown in two shades of pink (a) very light (1774–1804) and (b) medium (1805–1858) (Note: It included Ceylon and Lower Burma)
- Status: Chartered territory of East India Company
- Capital: Calcutta
- Official languages: English; Persian (until 1837); Urdu (from 1837)
- Government: Corporate oligarchy
- Governor-General
  - 1774–1785 (first Fort William): Warren Hastings
  - 1834–1835 (first India): Lord William Bentinck
  - 1857–1858 (last): Charles Canning
- Historical era: Early modern
  - Battle of Plassey: 23 June 1757
  - Battle of Buxar: 22–23 October 1764
  - Treaty of Allahabad: 16 August 1765
  - Anglo–Mysore wars: 1767–1799
  - Regulating Act: 21 June 1773
  - Anglo–Maratha wars: 1775–1819
  - Charter Act: 28 August 1833
  - Anglo–Sikh wars: 1845–1849
  - Indian Rebellion of 1857: 1857–1858
  - Government of India Act: 2 August 1858
  - Takeover by the Crown: 1 November 1858

Area
- 1858: 1,940,000 km^{2} (750,000 sq mi)
- Currency: Rupee
Preceded by
1793: Bengal State
1799: Sultanate of Mysore
1818: Maratha Confederacy
1826: Ahom Kingdom
1843: Sind
1849: Sikh Empire
1857: Mughal Empire
Others: States annexed under the Doctrine of Lapse
Succeeded by
British Raj
- Today part of: India; Pakistan; Bangladesh

Company rule in India (sometimes also Company Raj, from Hindi rāj, lit. 'rule') was the rule of the British East India Company on the Indian subcontinent. This is variously taken to have commenced in 1757, after the Battle of Plassey, when the Nawab of Bengal Siraj-ud-Daulah was defeated and replaced with Mir Jafar, who had the support of the East India Company; 1765, when the Company was granted the diwani, or the right to collect revenue, in Bengal and Bihar; or 1773, when the Company abolished local rule (Nizamat) in Bengal and established a capital in Calcutta, appointed its first Governor-General of Fort William, Warren Hastings, and became directly involved in governance. The Company's rule lasted until 1858, when, after the Indian Rebellion of 1857 and the Government of India Act 1858, the India Office of the British government assumed the task of directly administering India in the new British Raj.

== Expansion and territory ==
The English East India Company ("the Company") was founded in 1600, as The Company of Merchants of London Trading into the East Indies. It gained a foothold in India with the establishment of a factory in Masulipatnam on the Eastern coast of India in 1611 and the grant of the rights to establish a factory in Surat in 1612 by the Mughal Emperor Jahangir. In 1640, after receiving similar permission from the Vijayanagara ruler further south, a second factory was established in Madras on the southeastern coast. Bombay island, not far from Surat, a former Portuguese outpost gifted to England as dowry in the marriage of Catherine of Braganza to Charles II, was leased by the Company in 1668. Following the Anglo-Mughal War, the Company was allowed by Emperor Aurangzeb to establish a presence on the eastern coast as well; far up that coast, in the Ganges Delta, a factory was set up in Calcutta. Since, during this time other companies—established by the Portuguese, Dutch, French, and Danish—were similarly expanding in the region, the English Company's unremarkable beginnings on coastal India offered no clues to what would become a lengthy presence on the Indian subcontinent.

The company's victory under Robert Clive in the 1757 Battle of Plassey and another victory in the 1764 Battle of Buxar (in Bihar) consolidated the company's power and forced emperor Shah Alam II to appoint it the diwan, or revenue collector, of Bengal, Bihar, and Orissa. The Company thus became the de facto ruler of large areas of the Lower Gangetic Plain by 1773. It also proceeded by degrees to expand its dominions around Bombay and Madras. The Anglo-Mysore wars (1766–1799) and the Anglo-Maratha wars (1772–1818) left it in control of large areas of India south of the Sutlej river. With the defeat of the Marathas, no native power represented a threat for the Company any longer.

The expansion of the company's power chiefly took two forms. The first of these was the outright annexation of Indian states and subsequent direct governance of the underlying regions, which collectively came to comprise British India. The annexed regions included the North-Western Provinces (comprising Rohilkhand, Gorakhpur, and the Doab) (1801), Delhi (1803), Assam (Ahom kingdom 1828), and Sindh (1843). Punjab, North-West Frontier Province, and Kashmir, were annexed after the Anglo-Sikh Wars in 1849–1856 (Period of tenure of Marquess of Dalhousie Governor General); however, Kashmir was immediately sold under the Treaty of Amritsar (1850) to the Dogra dynasty of Jammu, and thereby became a princely state. In 1854 Berar was annexed, and the state of Oudh two years later.

The second form of asserting power involved treaties in which Indian rulers acknowledged the company's hegemony in return for limited internal autonomy. Since the Company operated under financial constraints, it had to set up political underpinnings for its rule. The most important such support came from the subsidiary alliances with Indian princes during the first 75 years of Company rule. In the early 19th century, the territories of these princes accounted for two-third of India. When an Indian ruler, who was able to secure his territory, wanted to enter such an alliance, the Company welcomed it as an economic method of indirect rule, which did not involve the economic costs of direct administration or the political costs of gaining the support of alien subjects.

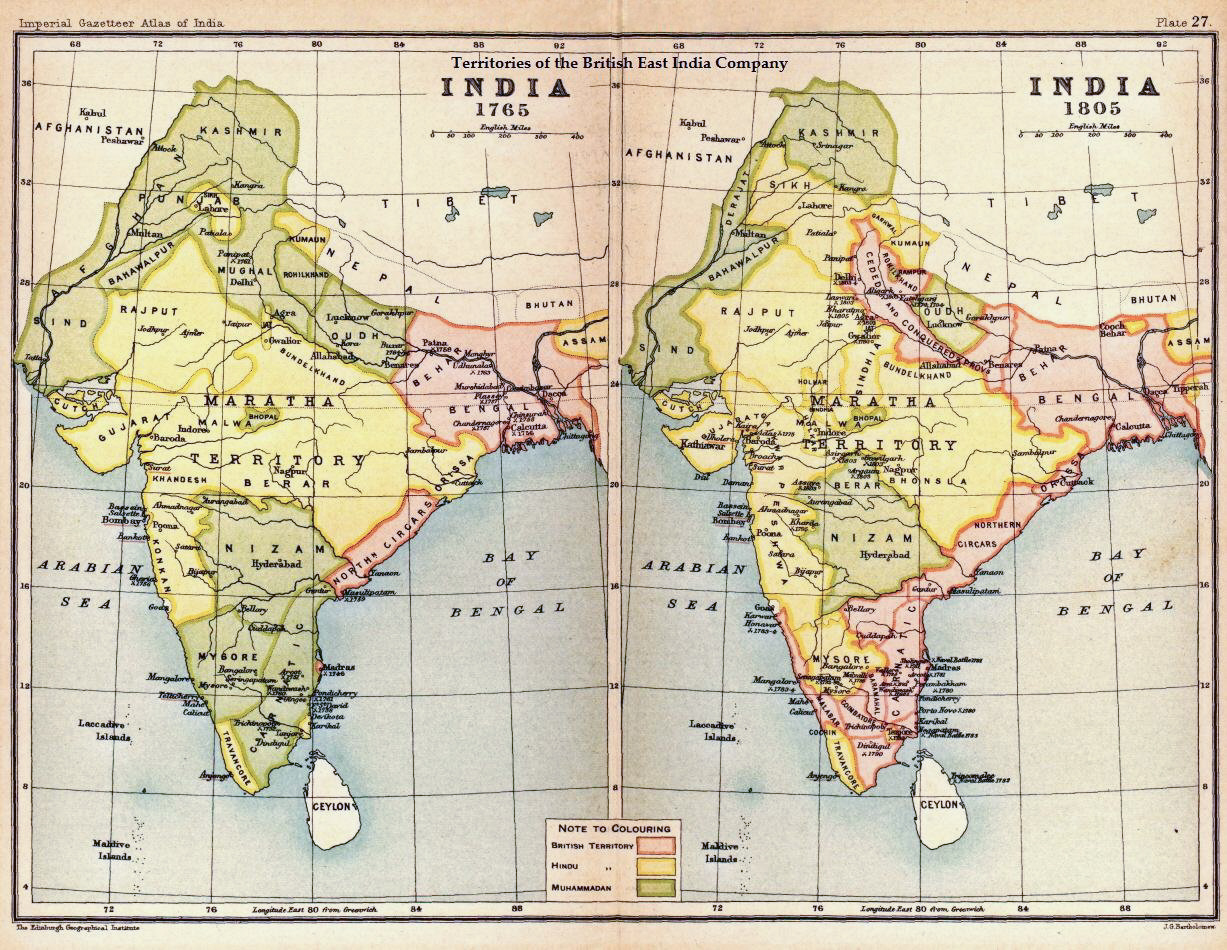
India in 1765 and 1805 showing East India Company Territories in pink.

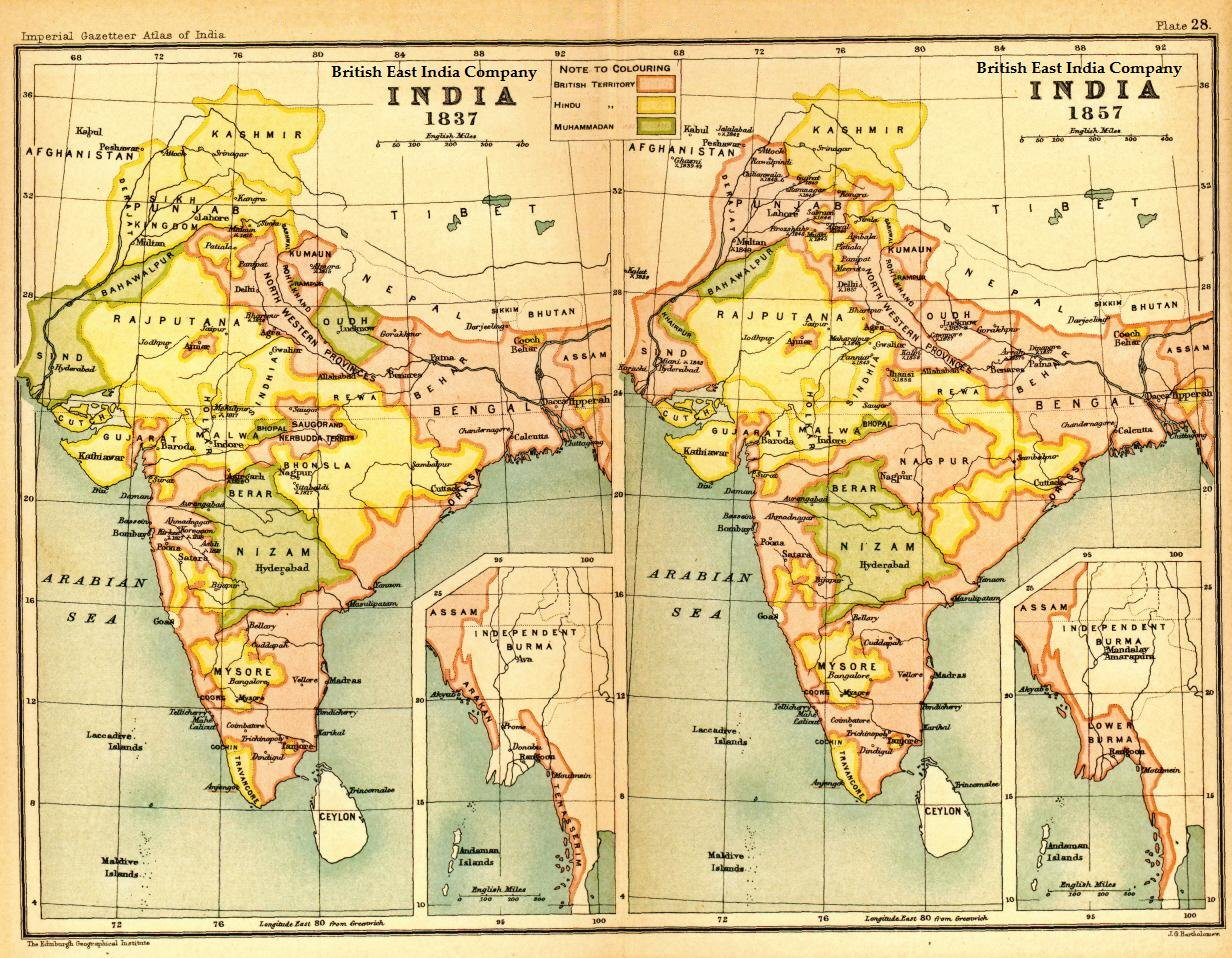
India in 1837 and 1857, showing East India Company-governed territories in pink.

In return, the Company undertook the "defence of these subordinate allies and treated them with traditional respect and marks of honor." Subsidiary alliances created the princely states, of the Hindu maharajas and the Muslim nawabs. Prominent among the princely states were: Cochin (1791), Jaipur (1794), Travancore (1795), Hyderabad (1798), Mysore (1799), Cis-Sutlej Hill States (1815), Central India Agency (1819), Cutch and Gujarat Gaikwad territories (1807–1820), Rajputana (1818), and Bahawalpur (1833).

== The Governors-General ==
Coins issued by the East India Company 1787 to 1840 CE
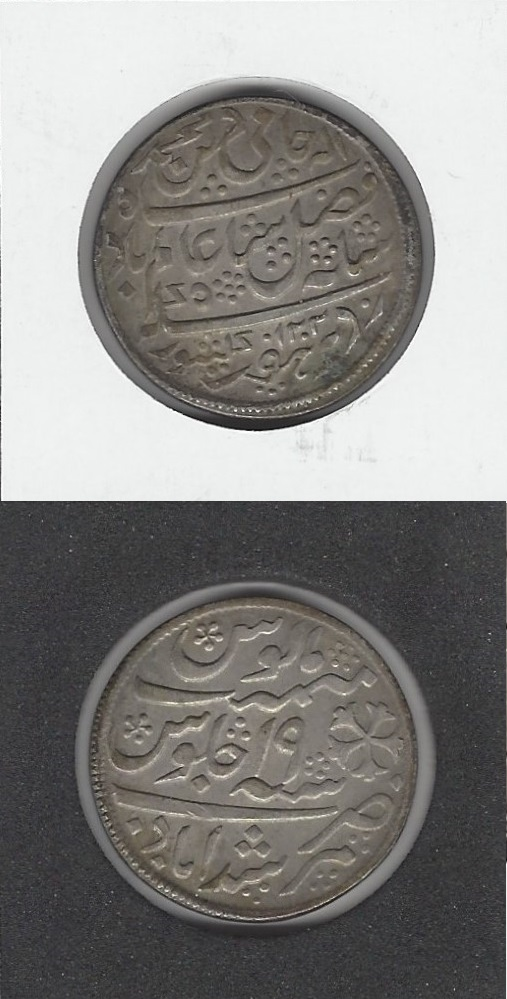
Silver Half-Rupee 1787 Bengal Presidency, Murshidabad Mint, issued in the name of Shah Alam II, Mughal Emperor

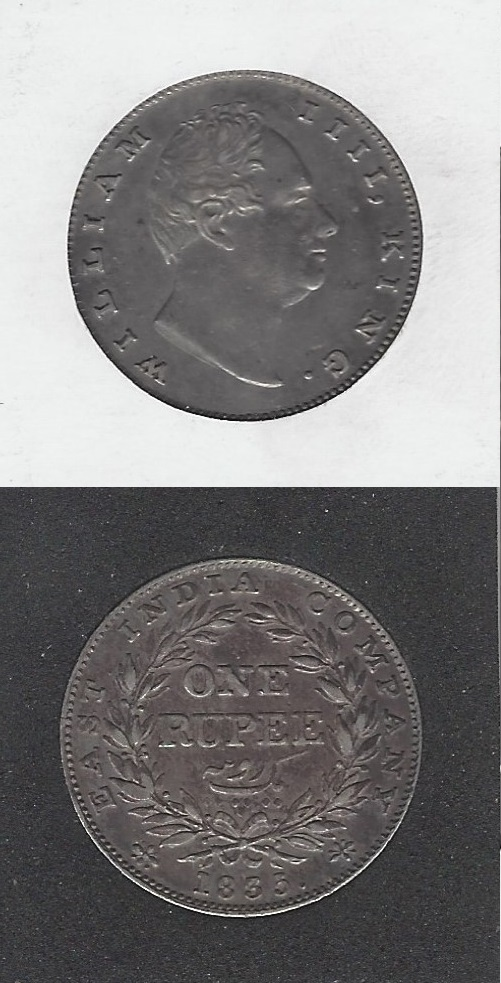
Silver Rupee 1835, William IV, King

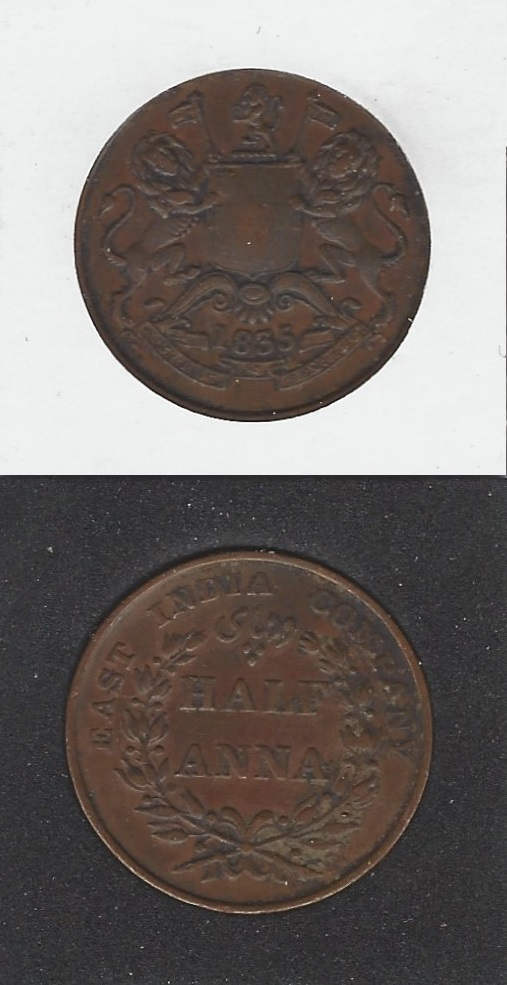
Copper Half-Anna 1835, William IV, King

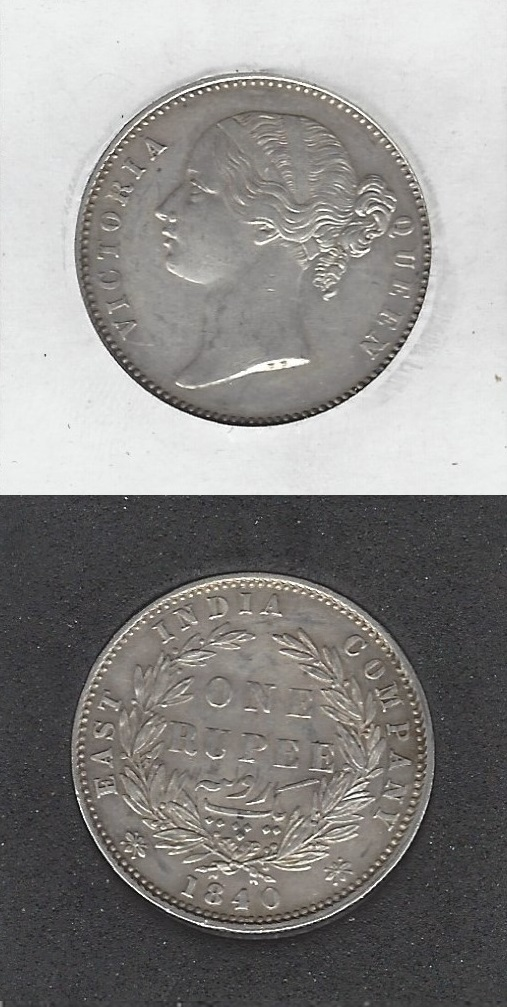
Silver Rupee 1840, Victoria, Queen

The Governors-General (locum tenens) are not included in this table unless a major event occurred during their tenure.

=== Governors-General of Fort William (Bengal) (1773–1834) ===
Governor-General	Period of tenure	Events
Warren Hastings	20 October 1773 – 1 February 1785	Great Bengal famine of 1770 (1769–73); Rohilla War (1773–74); First Anglo-Maratha War (1777–83); Chalisa famine (1783–84); Second Anglo-Mysore War (1780–1784)
Charles Cornwallis	12 September 1786 – 28 October 1793	Cornwallis Code (1793); Permanent Settlement; Cochin become semi-protected States under British (1791); Third Anglo-Mysore War (1789–92); Doji bara famine (1791–92)
John Shore	28 October 1793 – March 1798	East India Company Army re-organised and down-sized. First Pazhassi Revolt in Malabar(1793–97); Jaipur (1794) & Travancore (1795) come under British protection. Andaman Islands occupied (1796); Company took control of coastal region Ceylon from Dutch (1796).
Richard Wellesley	18 May 1798 – 30 July 1805	Nizam of Hyderabad becomes first State to sign Subsidiary alliance introduced by Wellesley (1798). Fourth Anglo-Mysore War (1798–99); Second Pazhassi Revolt in Malabar (1800–05); Nawab of Oudh cedes Gorakhpur and Rohilkhand divisions; Allahabad, Fatehpur, Cawnpore, Etawah, Mainpuri, Etah districts; part of Mirzapur; and terai of Kumaun (Ceded Provinces, 1801); Treaty of Bassein signed by Peshwa Baji Rao II accepting Subsidiary Alliance; Battle of Delhi (1803). Second Anglo-Maratha War (1803–05); Remainder of Doab, Delhi and Agra division, parts of Bundelkhand annexed from Maratha Empire (1805). Ceded and Conquered Provinces established (1805). Subsidiary alliances created the princely states of the Hindu maharajas and the Muslim nawabs.
Charles Cornwallis (second term)	30 July 1805 – 5 October 1805	Financial strain in East India Company after costly campaigns. Cornwallis reappointed to bring peace, but dies in Ghazipur.
George Hilario Barlow (locum tenens)	10 October 1805 – 31 July 1807	Vellore mutiny (10 July 1806)
Lord Minto	31 July 1807 – 4 October 1813	Invasion of Java; Occupation of Mauritius
Marquess of Hastings	4 October 1813 – 9 January 1823	Anglo-Nepalese War (1814); Annexation of Kumaon, Garhwal, and east Sikkim. Cis-Sutlej states (1815). Third Anglo-Maratha War (1817–18); States of Rajputana accept British suzerainty (1817). Singapore was founded (1818). Cutch accepts British suzerainty (1818). Gaikwads of Baroda accept British suzerainty (1819). Central India Agency (1819).
Lord Amherst	1 August 1823 – 13 March 1828	First Anglo–Burmese War (1823–26); Annexation of Assam, Manipur, Arakan, and Tenasserim from Burma
William Bentinck	4 July 1828 – 22 April 1834	Bengal Sati Regulation, 1829; Thuggee and Dacoity Suppression Acts, 1836–48; Mysore State goes under British administration (1831–81); Bahawalpur accepts British Suzerainty (1833) Government of India Act (1833)

=== Governors-General of India (1834–1858) ===
Governor-General	Period of Tenure	Events
William Bentinck	22 April 1834 – 20 March 1835	Coorg annexed (1834).
Lord Auckland	4 March 1836 – 28 February 1842	North-Western Provinces established (1836); Post Offices were established (1837); Agra famine of 1837–1838; Aden is captured by Company (1839); First Anglo-Afghan War (1839–1842); Massacre of Elphinstone's army (1842).
Lord Ellenborough	28 February 1842 – June 1844	First Anglo-Afghan War (1839–42); Annexation of Sindh (1843); Indian Slavery Act, 1843
Henry Hardinge	23 July 1844 – 12 January 1848	First Anglo-Sikh War (1845–46); Sikhs cede Jullundur Doab, Hazara, and Kashmir to the British under Treaty of Lahore (1846); Sale of Kashmir to Gulab Singh of Jammu under Treaty of Amritsar (1846).
Marquess of Dalhousie	12 January 1848 – 28 February 1856	Second Anglo-Sikh War (1848–1849); Annexation of Punjab and North-West Frontier Province (1849–56); Construction begins on Indian Railways (1850); Caste Disabilities Removal Act, 1850; First telegraph line laid in India (1851); Second Anglo-Burmese War (1852–53); Annexation of Lower Burma; Ganges Canal opened (1854); Annexation of Satara (1848), Jaipur and Sambalpur (1849), Nagpur and Jhansi (1854) under Doctrine of Lapse. Annexation of Berar (1853) and Awadh (1856). Postage Stamps for India were introduced. (1854). Public Telegram services started operation (1855).
Charles Canning	28 February 1856 – 1 November 1858	Hindu Widows' Remarriage Act (25 July 1856); First Indian universities founded (January–September 1857); Indian Rebellion of 1857 (10 May 1857 – 20 June 1858) largely in North-Western Provinces and Oudh; Liquidation of the English East India Company under Government of India Act 1858

== Regulation of Company rule ==
Until Clive's victory at Plassey, the East India Company territories in India, which consisted largely of the presidency towns of Calcutta, Madras, and Bombay, were governed by the mostly autonomous—and sporadically unmanageable—town councils, all composed of merchants. The councils barely had enough powers for the effective management of their local affairs, and the ensuing lack of oversight of the overall Company operations in India led to some grave abuses by Company officers or their allies. Clive's victory, and the award of the diwani of the rich region of Bengal, brought India into the public spotlight in Britain. The company's money management practices came to be questioned, especially as it began to post net losses even as some Company servants, the "Nabobs", returned to Britain with large fortunes, which—according to rumours then current—were acquired unscrupulously. By 1772, the Company needed British government loans to stay afloat, and there was fear in London that the company's corrupt practices could soon seep into British business and public life. The rights and duties of the British government about the company's new territories also came to be examined. The British parliament then held several inquiries and in 1773, during the premiership of Lord North, enacted the Regulating Act 1773, which established regulations, its long title stated, "for the better Management of the Affairs of the East India Company, as well in India as in Europe".

Although Lord North himself wanted the company's territories to be taken over by the British state, he faced determined political opposition from many quarters, including some in the City of London and the Parliament of Great Britain. The result was a compromise in which the Regulating Act—although implying the ultimate sovereignty of the British Crown over these new territories—asserted that the company could act as a sovereign power on behalf of the Crown. It could do this while concurrently being subject to oversight and regulation by the British government and parliament. The Court of Directors of the company was required under the Act to submit all communications regarding civil, military, and revenue matters in India for scrutiny by the British government. For the governance of the Indian territories, the act asserted the supremacy of the Presidency of Fort William (Bengal) over those of Fort St. George (Madras) and Bombay. It also nominated a Governor-General (Warren Hastings) and four councillors for administering the Bengal Presidency (and for overseeing the company's operations in India). "The subordinate Presidencies were forbidden to wage war or make treaties without the previous consent of the Governor-General of Bengal in Council, except in case of imminent necessity. The Governors of these Presidencies were directed in general terms to obey the orders of the Governor-General-in-Council, and to transmit to him intelligence of all important matters." However, the imprecise wording of the Act left it open to be variously interpreted; consequently, the administration in India continued to be hobbled by disunity between the provincial governors, between members of the council, and between the Governor-General himself and his Council. The Regulating Act also attempted to address the prevalent corruption in India: Company servants were henceforth forbidden to engage in private trade in India or to receive "presents" from Indian nationals.

In 1783, the Fox–North coalition tried to reform colonial policy again with a bill introduced by Edmund Burke which would have transferred political power over India from the East India Company to a parliamentary commission. The bill passed the House of Commons with the enthusiastic support of Foreign Secretary Charles James Fox, but was vetoed by the House of Lords under pressure from King George III, who then dismissed the government and formed a new ministry under Fox's rival William Pitt the Younger. Pitt's India Act left the East India Company in political control of India but established a Board of Control in England both to supervise the East India Company's affairs and to prevent the company's shareholders from interfering in the governance of India. The Board of Control consisted of six members, which included one Secretary of State from the British cabinet, as well as the Chancellor of the Exchequer. Around this time, there was also extensive debate in the British Parliament on the issue of landed rights in Bengal, with a consensus developing in support of the view advocated by Philip Francis, a member of the Bengal council and political adversary of Warren Hastings, that all lands in Bengal should be considered the "estate and inheritance of native land-holders and families".

Mindful of the reports of abuse and corruption in Bengal by Company servants, the India Act itself noted numerous complaints that "'divers Rajahs, Zamindars, Talukdars, and landholders' had been unjustly deprived of 'their lands, jurisdictions, rights, and privileges'". At the same time the company's directors were now leaning towards Francis's view that the land-tax in Bengal should be made fixed and permanent, setting the stage for the Permanent Settlement (see section Revenue collection below). The India Act also created in each of the three presidencies a number of administrative and military posts, which included: a Governor and three Councilors, one of whom was the Commander in Chief of the Presidency army. Although the supervisory powers of the Governor-General-in-Council in Bengal (over Madras and Bombay) were extended—as they were again in the Charter Act 1793—the subordinate presidencies continued to exercise some autonomy until both the extension of British territories into becoming contiguous and the advent of faster communications in the next century.

Still, the new Governor-General appointed in 1786, Lord Cornwallis, not only had more power than Hastings, but also had the support of a powerful British cabinet minister, Henry Dundas, who, as Secretary of State for the Home Office, was in charge of the overall India policy. From 1784 onwards, the British government had the final word on all major appointments in India; a candidate's suitability for a senior position was often decided by the strength of his political connections rather than that of his administrative ability. Although this practice resulted in many Governor-General nominees being chosen from Britain's conservative landed gentry, there were some liberals as well, such as Lord William Bentinck and Lord Dalhousie.

British political opinion was also shaped by the attempted Impeachment of Warren Hastings; the trial, whose proceedings began in 1788, ended with Hastings' acquittal in 1795. Although the effort was chiefly coordinated by Edmund Burke, it also drew support from within the British government. Burke accused Hastings not only of corruption, but—appealing to universal standards of justice—also of acting solely upon his own discretion, without concern for law, and of wilfully causing distress to others in India. Hastings' defenders countered that his actions were consistent with Indian customs and traditions. Although Burke's speeches at the trial drew applause and focused attention on India, Hastings was eventually acquitted, due in part to the revival of nationalism in Britain in the wake of the French Revolution. Nonetheless, Burke's effort had the effect of creating a sense of responsibility in British public life for the company's dominion in India.

Soon rumblings appeared amongst merchants in London that the monopoly granted to the East India Company in 1600, intended to facilitate its competition against Dutch and French in a distant region, was no longer needed. In response, in the Charter Act 1813, the British Parliament renewed the company's charter but terminated its monopoly except about tea and trade with China, opening India both to private investment and missionaries. With increased British power in India, supervision of Indian affairs by the British Crown and Parliament increased as well. By the 1820s, British nationals could transact business or engage in missionary work under the protection of the Crown in the three presidencies. Finally, under the terms of the Saint Helena Act 1833, the British Parliament revoked the company's monopoly in the China trade and made it an agent for the administration of British India. The Governor-General of Bengal was redesignated as the Governor-General of India. The Governor-General and his executive council were given exclusive legislative powers for the whole of British India. Since the British territories in north India had now extended up to Delhi, the act also sanctioned the creation of a Presidency of Agra. With the annexation of Oudh in 1856, this territory was extended and eventually became the United Provinces of Agra and Oudh. In addition, in 1854, a lieutenant-governor was appointed for the region of Bengal, Bihar and Odisha, leaving the Governor-General to concentrate on the governance of India as a whole.

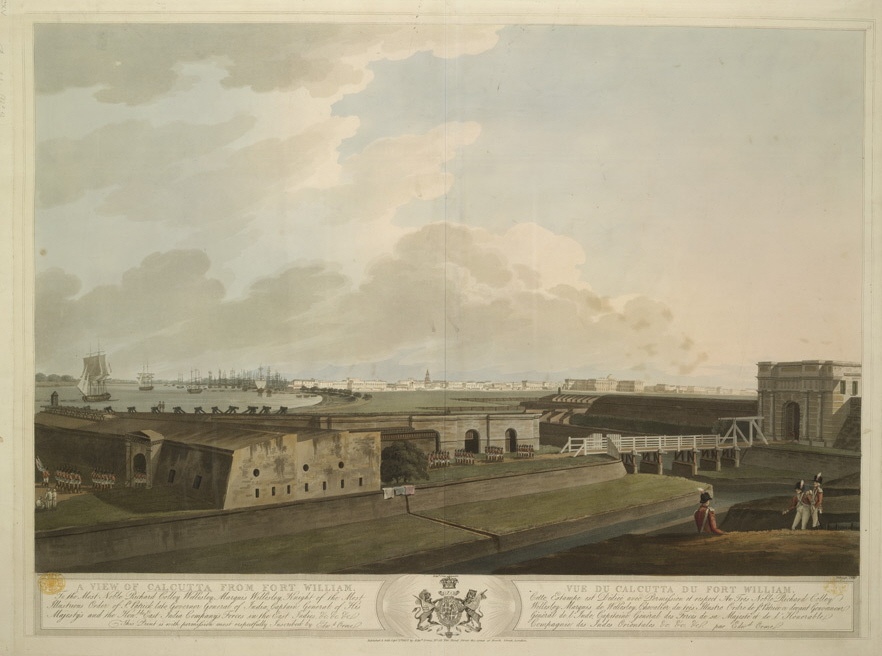
A view of Calcutta from Fort William, 1807.

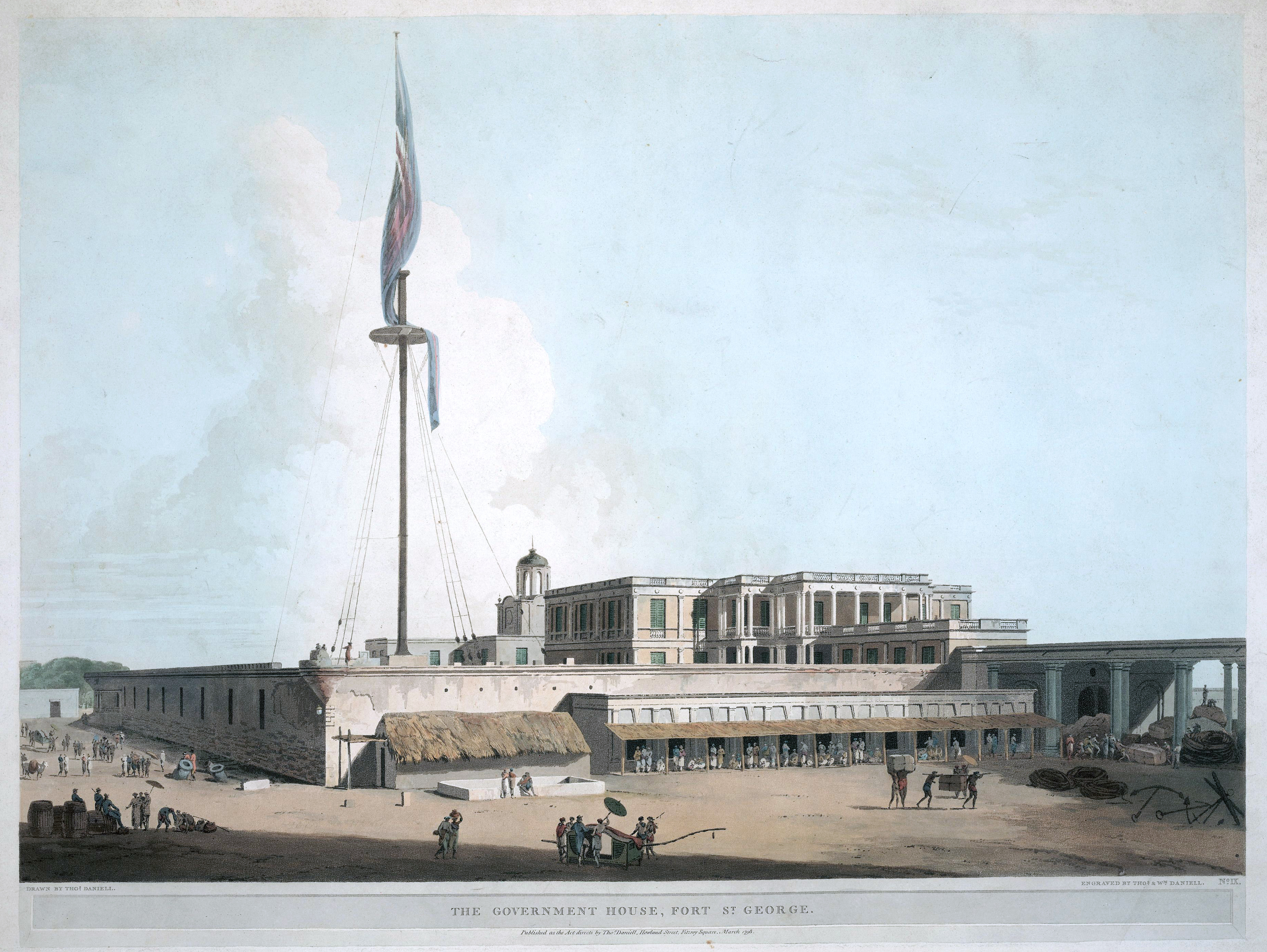
Government House, Fort St. George, Madras, the headquarters of the Madras Presidency.

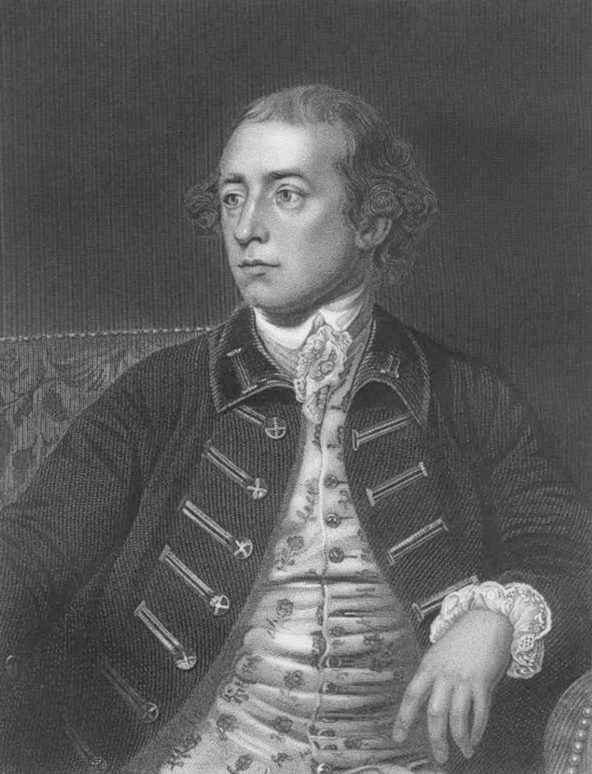
Warren Hastings, the first Governor-General of Fort William (Bengal) who oversaw the Company's territories in India.

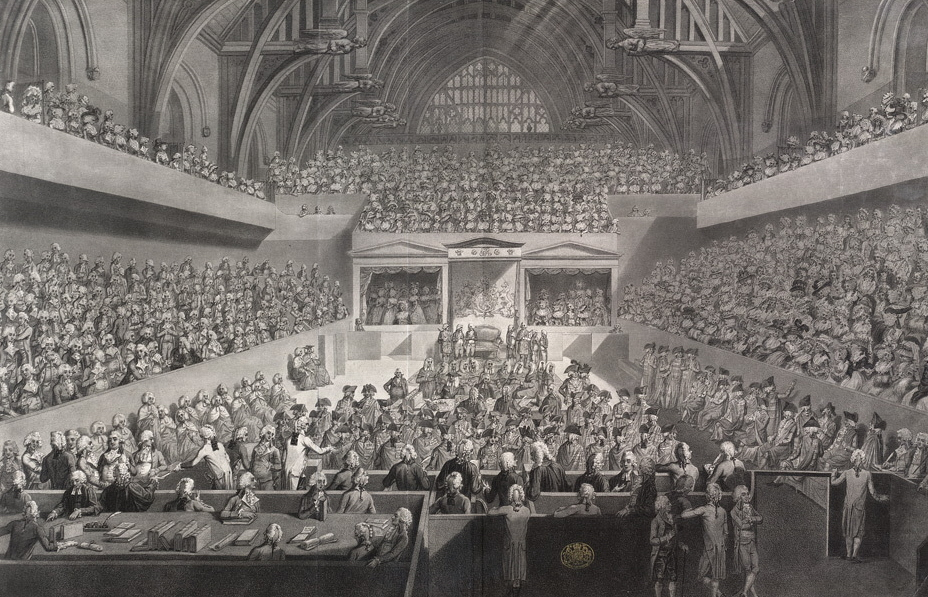
The trial of Warren Hastings in the Court of Westminster Hall, 1789.

== Revenue collection ==
In the remnant of the Mughal Empire revenue system existing in pre-1765 Bengal, zamindars, or "land holders", collected revenue on behalf of the Mughal emperor, whose representative, or diwan, supervised their activities. In this system, the assortment of rights associated with land was not possessed by a "land owner", but rather shared by several parties with a stake in the land, including the peasant cultivator, the zamindar, and the state. The zamindar served as an intermediary who procured rent from the cultivator, and after withholding a percentage for his own expenses, made available the rest, as revenue to the state. Under the Mughal system, the land itself belonged to the state and not to the zamindar, who could transfer only his right to collect rent. On being awarded the diwani or overlordship of Bengal following the Battle of Buxar in 1764, the East India Company found itself short of trained administrators, especially those familiar with local custom and law; tax collection was consequently farmed out. This uncertain foray into land taxation by the company may have gravely worsened the impact of a famine that struck Bengal in 1769–70, in which between seven and ten million people—or between a quarter and third of the presidency's population—may have died. However, the company provided little relief either through reduced taxation or by relief efforts, and the economic and cultural impact of the famine was felt decades later, even becoming, a century later, the subject of Bankim Chandra Chatterjee's novel Anandamath.

In 1772, under Warren Hastings, the East India Company took over revenue collection directly in the Bengal Presidency (then Bengal and Bihar), establishing a Board of Revenue with offices in Calcutta and Patna, and moving the pre-existing Mughal revenue records from Murshidabad to Calcutta. In 1773, after Oudh ceded the tributary state of Benaras, the revenue collection system was extended to the territory with a Company Resident in charge. The following year—with a view to preventing corruption—Company district collectors, who were then responsible for revenue collection for an entire district, were replaced with provincial councils at Patna, Murshidabad, and Calcutta, and with Indian collectors working within each district. The title, "collector", reflected "the centrality of land revenue collection to government in India: it was the government's primary function, and it moulded the institutions and patterns of administration".

The Company inherited a revenue collection system from the Mughals in which the heaviest proportion of the tax burden fell on the cultivators, with one-third of the production reserved for imperial entitlement; this pre-colonial system became the Company revenue policy's baseline. However, there was vast variation across India in the methods by which the revenues were collected; with this complication in mind, a Committee of Circuit toured the districts of expanded Bengal Presidency to make a five-year settlement, consisting of five-yearly inspections and temporary tax farming. In their overall approach to revenue policy, Company officials were guided by two goals: first, preserving as much as possible the balance of rights and obligations that were traditionally claimed by the farmers who cultivated the land and the various intermediaries who collected tax on the state's behalf and who reserved a cut for themselves; and second, identifying those sectors of the rural economy that would maximise both revenue and security. Although their first revenue settlement turned out to be essentially the same as the more informal pre-existing Mughal one, the company had created a foundation for the growth of both information and bureaucracy.

In 1793, the new Governor-General, Lord Cornwallis, promulgated the permanent settlement of land revenues in the presidency, the first socio-economic regulation in colonial India. By the terms of the settlement, rajas and taluqdars were recognised as zamindars, and they were asked to collect the rent from the peasants and pay revenue to the company. It was named permanent because it fixed the land tax in perpetuity in return for landed property rights for zamindars; it simultaneously defined the nature of land ownership in the presidency, and gave individuals and families separate property rights in occupied land. Since the revenue was fixed in perpetuity, it was fixed at a high level, which in Bengal amounted to £3 million at 1789–90 prices. According to the Permanent Settlement, if the zamindars failed to pay the revenue on time, the zamindari right would be taken from them. According to one estimate, this was 20% higher than the revenue demand before 1757. Over the next century, partly as a result of land surveys, court rulings, and property sales, the change was given practical dimension. An influence on the development of this revenue policy was the economic theories then current, which regarded agriculture as the engine of economic development, and consequently stressed the fixing of revenue demands to encourage growth. The expectation behind the permanent settlement was that knowledge of a fixed government demand would encourage the zamindars to increase both their average outcrop and the land under cultivation, since they would be able to retain the profits from the increased output; in addition, it was envisaged that land itself would become a marketable form of property that could be purchased, sold, or mortgaged. A feature of this economic rationale was the additional expectation that the zamindars, recognizing their own best interest, would not make unreasonable demands on the peasantry.

However, these expectations were not realised in practice, and in many regions of Bengal, the peasants bore the brunt of the increased demand, there being little protection for their traditional rights in the new legislation. Forced labour of the peasants by the zamindars became more prevalent as cash crops were cultivated to meet the Company revenue demands. Although commercialised cultivation was not new to the region, it had now penetrated deeper into village society and made it more vulnerable to market forces. The zamindars themselves were often unable to meet the increased demands that the company had placed on them; consequently, many defaulted, and by one estimate, up to one-third of their lands were auctioned during the first two decades following the permanent settlement. The new owners were often Brahmin and Kayastha employees of the Company who had a good grasp of the new system, and had, in many cases, prospered from it. Since the zamindars were never able to undertake costly improvements to the land envisaged under the Permanent Settlement, some of which required the removal of the existing farmers, they soon became rentiers who lived off the rent from their tenant farmers. In many areas, especially northern Bengal, they had to increasingly share the revenue with intermediate tenure holders, called jotedars, who supervised farming in the villages. Consequently, unlike the contemporaneous Enclosure movement in Britain, agriculture in Bengal remained the province of the subsistence farming of innumerable small paddy fields.

The zamindari system was one of two principal revenue settlements undertaken by the Company in India. In southern India, Thomas Munro, who would later become Governor of Madras, promoted the ryotwari system or the Munro system, in which the government settled land-revenue directly with the peasant farmers, or ryots. It was first tried in small scale by Captain Alexander Read in the areas that were taken over from the wars with Tipu Sultan. Subsequently, developed by Thomas Munro, this system was gradually extended all over South India. This was, in part, a consequence of the turmoil of the Anglo-Mysore Wars, which had prevented the emergence of a class of large landowners; in addition, Munro and others felt that ryotwari was closer to traditional practice in the region and ideologically more progressive, allowing the benefits of Company rule to reach the lowest levels of rural society. At the heart of the ryotwari system was a particular theory of economic rent—and based on David Ricardo's Law of Rent—promoted by utilitarian James Mill who formulated the Indian revenue policy between 1819 and 1830. "He believed that the government was the ultimate lord of the soil and should not renounce its right to 'rent', i.e. the profit left over on richer soil when wages and other working expenses had been settled." Another keystone of the new system of temporary settlements was the classification of agricultural fields according to soil type and produce, with average rent rates fixed for the period of the settlement. According to Mill, taxation of land rent would promote efficient agriculture and simultaneously prevent the emergence of a "parasitic landlord class". Mill advocated ryotwari settlements which consisted of government measurement and assessment of each plot (valid for 20 or 30 years) and subsequent taxation which was dependent on the fertility of the soil. The taxed amount was nine-tenths of the "rent" in the early 19th century and gradually fell afterwards. However, despite the appeal of the ryotwari system's abstract principles, class hierarchies in southern Indian villages had not entirely disappeared—for example, village headmen continued to hold sway—and peasant cultivators sometimes came to experience revenue demands they could not meet. In the 1850s, a scandal erupted when it was discovered that some Indian revenue agents of the company were using torture to meet the company's revenue demands.

Land revenue settlements constituted a major administrative activity of the various governments in India under Company rule. In all areas other than the Bengal Presidency, land settlement work involved a continually repetitive process of surveying and measuring plots, assessing their quality, and recording landed rights, and constituted a large proportion of the work of Indian Civil Service officers working for the government. After the Company lost its trading rights, it became the single most important source of government revenue, roughly half of overall revenue in the middle of the 19th century; even so, between the years 1814 and 1859, the government of India ran debts in 33 years. With expanded dominion, even during non-deficit years, there was just enough money to pay the salaries of a threadbare administration, a skeleton police force, and the army.

A riverside scene in rural east Bengal (present-day Bangladesh), 1860

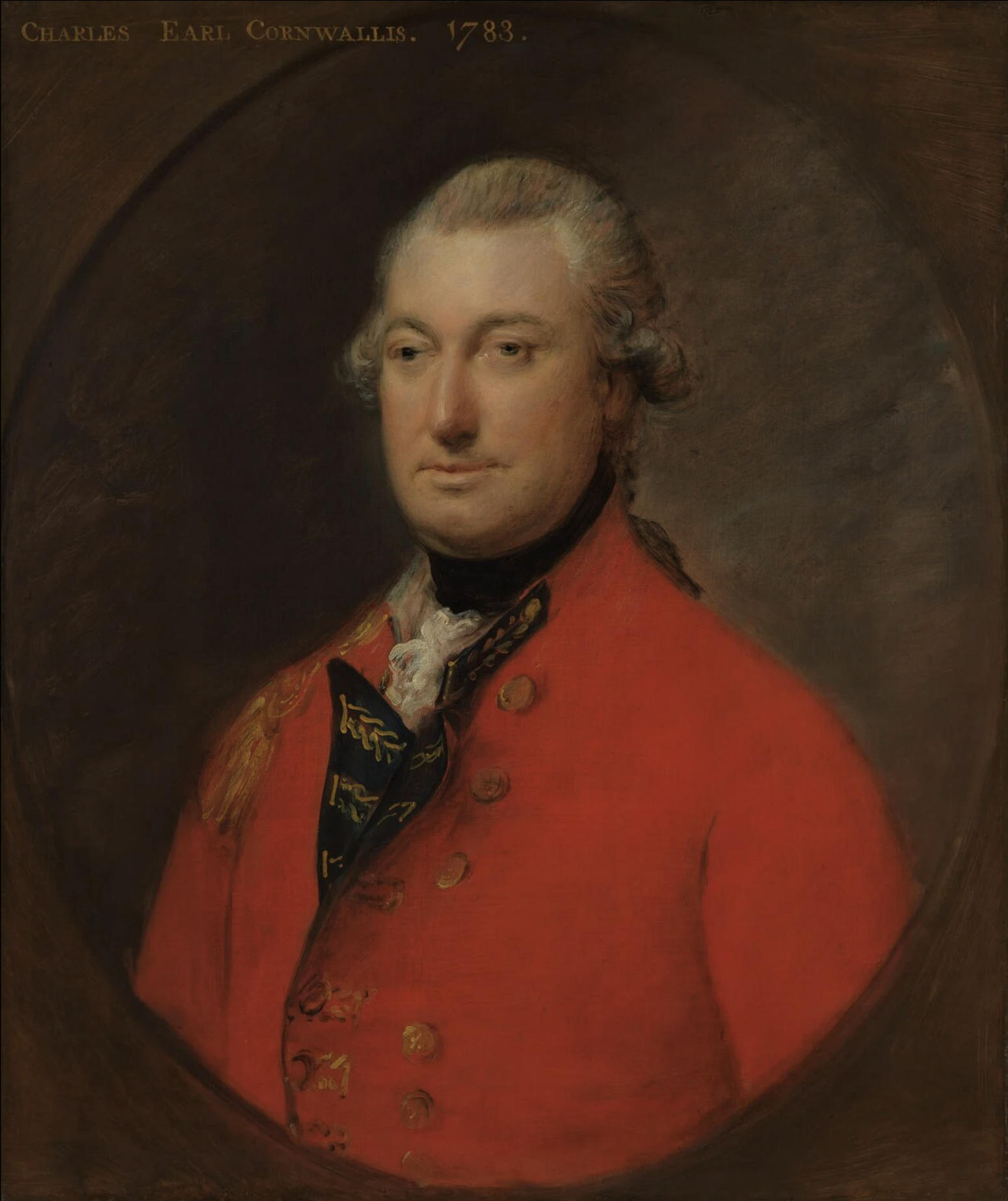
Charles Cornwallis, the Governor-General of India when Permanent Settlement was introduced

A Kochh Mandai woman of East Bengal with an agricultural knife and a freshly harvested jackfruit (1860)

Paddy fields in the Madras Presidency, c. 1880. Two-thirds of the presidency fell under the Ryotwari system.

== Army and civil service ==
In 1772, when Hastings became the first Governor-General, one of his first undertakings was the rapid expansion of the Presidency's army. Since the available soldiers, or Sepoys, from Bengal—many of whom had fought against the British in the Battle of Plassey – were now suspect in British eyes, Hastings recruited farther west from the "major breeding ground" of India's infantry in eastern Awadh and the lands around Banaras including Bihar. The high caste rural Hindu Rajputs and Brahmins of this region, known as Purbiyas (Hindi, lit. "easterners"), had been recruited by Mughal Empire armies for two hundred years; the East India Company continued this practice for the next 75 years, with these soldiers comprising up to eighty per cent of the Bengal army. However, to avoid any friction within the ranks, the company also took pains to adapt its military practices to their religious requirements. Consequently, these soldiers dined in separate facilities; in addition, overseas service, considered polluting to their caste, was not required of them, and the army soon came to recognise Hindu festivals officially. "This encouragement of high caste ritual status, however, left the government vulnerable to protest, even mutiny, whenever the sepoys detected infringement of their prerogatives."

East India Company armies after the Re-organisation of 1796
British troops	Indian troops		
	Bengal Presidency	Madras Presidency	Bombay Presidency
	24,000	24,000	9,000
13,000	Total Indian troops: 57,000		
Total British and Indian troops: 70,000

The Bengal Army was used in military campaigns in other parts of India and abroad: to provide crucial support to a weak Madras army in the Third Anglo-Mysore War in 1791, and also in Java and Ceylon. In contrast to the soldiers in the armies of Indian rulers, the Bengal sepoys not only received high pay, but also received it reliably, thanks in great measure to the company's access to the vast land-revenue reserves of Bengal. Soon, bolstered both by the new musket technology and naval support, the Bengal army came to be widely well-regarded. The well-disciplined sepoys attired in red-coats and their British officers began to arouse "a kind of awe in their adversaries. In Maharashtra and in Java, the sepoys were regarded as the embodiment of demonic forces, sometimes of antique warrior heroes. Indian rulers adopted red serge jackets for their own forces and retainers as if to capture their magical qualities."

In 1796, under pressure from the company's board of directors in London, the Indian troops were reorganised and reduced during the tenure of John Shore as Governor-General. However, the closing years of the 18th century saw, with Wellesley's campaigns, a new increase in the army strength. Thus in 1806, at the time of the Vellore Mutiny, the combined strength of the three presidencies' armies stood at 154,500, making them one of the largest standing armies in the world.

East India Company armies on the eve of the Vellore Mutiny of 1806
Presidencies	British troops	Indian troops	Total
Bengal	7,000	57,000	64,000
Madras	11,000	53,000	64,000
Bombay	6,500	20,000	26,500
Total	24,500	130,000	154,500

As the East India Company expanded its territories, it added irregular "local corps", which were not as well trained as the army. In 1846, after the Second Anglo-Sikh War, a frontier brigade was raised in the Cis-Sutlej Hill States mainly for police work; in addition, in 1849, the "Punjab Irregular Force" was added on the frontier. Two years later, this force consisted of "3 light field batteries, 5 regiments of cavalry, and 5 of infantry". The following year, "a garrison company was added, ... a sixth infantry regiment (formed from the Sind Camel Corps) in 1853, and one mountain battery in 1856". Similarly, a local force was raised after the annexation of Nagpur in 1854, and the "Oudh Irregular Force" was added after Oudh was annexed in 1856. Earlier, as a result of the treaty of 1800, the Nizam of Hyderabad had begun to maintain a contingent force of 9,000 horse and 6,000-foot which was commanded by Company officers; in 1853, after a new treaty was negotiated, this force was assigned to Berar and stopped being a part of the Nizam's army.

East India Company armies on the eve of the Indian rebellion of 1857
Presidencies	British troops				Indian troops				
	Cavalry	Artillery	Infantry	Total	Cavalry	Artillery	Sappers & Miners	Infantry	Total
Bengal	1,366	3,063	17,003	21,432	19,288	4,734	1,497	112,052	137,571
Madras	639	2,128	5,941	8,708	3,202	2,407	1,270	42,373	49,252
Bombay	681	1,578	7,101	9,360	8,433	1,997	637	33,861	44,928
Local forces and contingents					6,796	2,118		23,640	32,554
" " (unclassified)									7,756
Military police									38,977
Total	2,686	6,769	30,045	39,500	37,719	11,256	3,404	211,926	311,038
Grand Total, British and Indian troops									350,538

In the Indian rebellion of 1857, almost the entire Bengal army, both regular and irregular, revolted. It has been suggested that after the annexation of Oudh by the East India Company in 1856, many sepoys were disquieted both from losing their perquisites, as landed gentry, in the Oudh courts and from the anticipation of any increased land-revenue payments that the annexation might augur. With British victories in wars or with annexation, as the extent of British jurisdiction expanded, the soldiers were now not only expected to serve in less familiar regions (such as in Burma in the Anglo-Burmese Wars in 1856), but also make do without the "foreign service", remuneration that had previously been their due, and this caused resentment in the ranks. The Bombay and Madras armies, and the Hyderabad contingent, however, remained loyal. The Punjab Irregular Force not only did not revolt, but it also played an active role in suppressing the mutiny. The rebellion led to a complete re-organisation of the Indian army in 1858 in the new British Raj.

=== Civil service ===
The reforms initiated after 1784 were designed to create an elite civil service where very talented young Britons would spend their entire careers. Advanced training was promoted especially at the East India Company College (until 1853). Haileybury emphasised the Anglican religion and morality and trained students in the classical Indian languages. Many students held to Whiggish, evangelical, and Utilitarian convictions of their duty to represent their nation and to modernise India. At most, there were about 600 of these men who managed the Raj's customs service, taxes, justice system, and its general administration. The company's original policy was one of "Orientalism", that is, of adjusting to the way of life and customs of the Indian people and not trying to reform them. That changed after 1813, as the forces of reform in the home country, especially evangelical religion, Whiggish political outlook, and Utilitarian philosophy, worked together to make the company an agent of Anglicization and modernisation. Christian missionaries became active, but made few converts. The Raj set out to outlaw sati (widow-burning) and thuggee (ritual banditry) and upgrade the status of women. Schools would be established in which they would teach the English language. The 1830s and 1840s, however, were not times of prosperity: After its heavy spending on the military, the company had little money to engage in large-scale public works projects or modernisation programs.

A Royal Artillery encampment at Arcot, Madras Presidency, 1804.

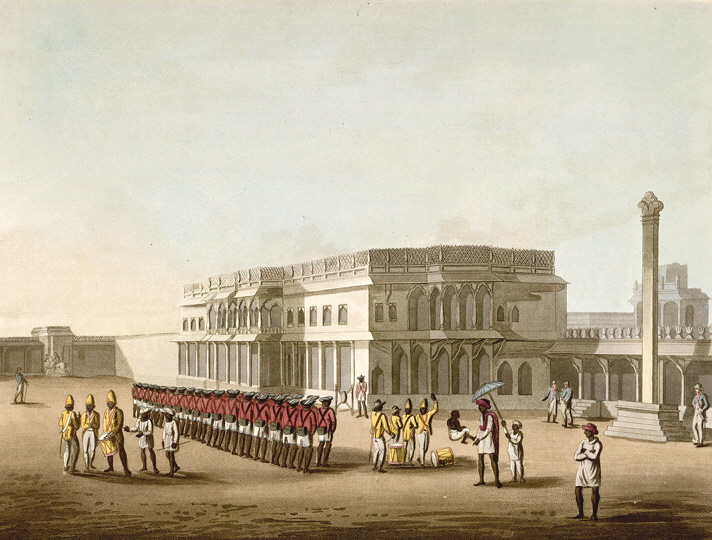
East India Company Sepoys (Indian infantrymen) in red coats outside Tipu Sultan's former summer palace in Bangalore, 1804

Military Orphan School for private soldiers of the East India Company, Howrah, Bengal Presidency, 1794.

A new "writer" in the East India Company Civil Service arrives in Calcutta. A palanquin transport awaits him.

== Trade ==
After gaining the right to collect revenue in Bengal in 1765, the Company largely ceased importing gold and silver, which it had hitherto used to pay for goods shipped back to Britain.

Export of bullion to India, by EIC (1708–1810)
Years	Bullion (£)	Average per annum
1708/9-1733/4	12,189,147	420,315
1734/5-1759/60	15,239,115	586,119
1760/1-1765/6	842,381	140,396
1766/7-1771/2	968,289	161,381
1772/3-1775/6	72,911	18,227
1776/7-1784/5	156,106	17,345
1785/6-1792/3	4,476,207	559,525
1793/4-1809/10	8,988,165	528,715

In addition, as under Mughal Empire rule, land revenue collected in the Bengal Presidency helped finance the company's wars in other parts of India. Consequently, in the period 1760–1800, Bengal's money supply was greatly diminished; furthermore, the closing of some local mints and close supervision of the rest, the fixing of exchange rates, and the standardisation of coinage, paradoxically, added to the economic downturn. During the period, 1780–1860, India changed from being an exporter of processed goods for which it received payment in bullion, to being an exporter of raw materials and a buyer of manufactured goods. More specifically, in the 1750s, mostly fine cotton and silk was exported from India to markets in Europe, Asia, and Africa; by the second quarter of the 19th century, raw materials, which chiefly consisted of raw cotton, opium, and indigo, accounted for most of India's exports. Also, from the late 18th century British cotton mill industry began to lobby the government to both tax Indian imports and allow them access to markets in India. Starting in the 1830s, British textiles began to appear in—and soon to inundate—the Indian markets, with the value of the textile imports growing from £5.2 million 1850 to £18.4 million in 1896. The American Civil War too would have a major impact on India's cotton economy: with the outbreak of the war, American cotton was no longer available to British manufacturers; consequently, demand for Indian cotton soared, and the prices soon quadrupled. This led many farmers in India to switch to cultivating cotton as a quick cash crop; however, with the end of the war in 1865, the demand plummeted again, creating another downturn in the agricultural economy.

At this time, the East India Company's trade with China began to grow as well. In the early 19th century, demand for Chinese tea had greatly increased in Britain; since the money supply in India was restricted and the company was indisposed to shipping bullion from Britain, it decided upon opium, which had a large underground market in Qing China and which was grown in many parts of India, as the most profitable form of payment. However, since the Chinese authorities had banned the importation and consumption of opium, the Company engaged them in the First Opium War, and at its conclusion, under the Treaty of Nanjing, gained access to five Chinese ports, Guangzhou, Xiamen, Fuzhou, Shanghai, and Ningbo; in addition, Hong Kong was ceded to the British Crown. Towards the end of the second quarter of the 19th century, opium export constituted 40% of India's exports. Opium was grown by peasant farmers in the Ganges plain (Uttar Pradesh and Bihar, today), under a government monopoly run by an Opium Department, also called as Opium Agency whose agents monitored cultivators, advanced them money and enforced production targets. According to historian Rolf Bauer, cultivators were paid less for raw opium than it cost them to grow, and the system depended on coercion. Bauer says poppy was cultivated at a substantial loss, its cultivation was hugely exploitative and it impoverished Indian peasants.

Another major, though erratic, export item was indigo dye, which was extracted from natural indigo, and which came to be grown in Bengal and northern Bihar. In 1788, the East India Company offered advances to ten British planters to grow indigo; however, since the new (landed) property rights defined in the Permanent Settlement, did not allow them, as Europeans, to buy agricultural land, they had to in turn offer cash advances to local peasants, and sometimes coerce them, to grow the crop. In early 19th century Europe, blue clothing was favoured as a fashion, and blue uniforms were common in the military; consequently, the demand for the dye was high. The European demand for the dye, however, proved to be unstable, and both creditors and cultivators bore the risk of market crashes in 1827 and 1847. The peasant discontent in Bengal eventually led to the Indigo rebellion in 1859–60 and to the end of indigo production there. In Bihar, however, indigo production continued well into the 20th century; a centre of indigo production there, Champaran district, became an early testing ground, in 1917, for Mohandas Karamchand Gandhi's strategy of non-violent resistance against the British Raj.

Photograph of East India Company factory in Painam, Sonargaon, a major producer of the celebrated Dhaka muslins.

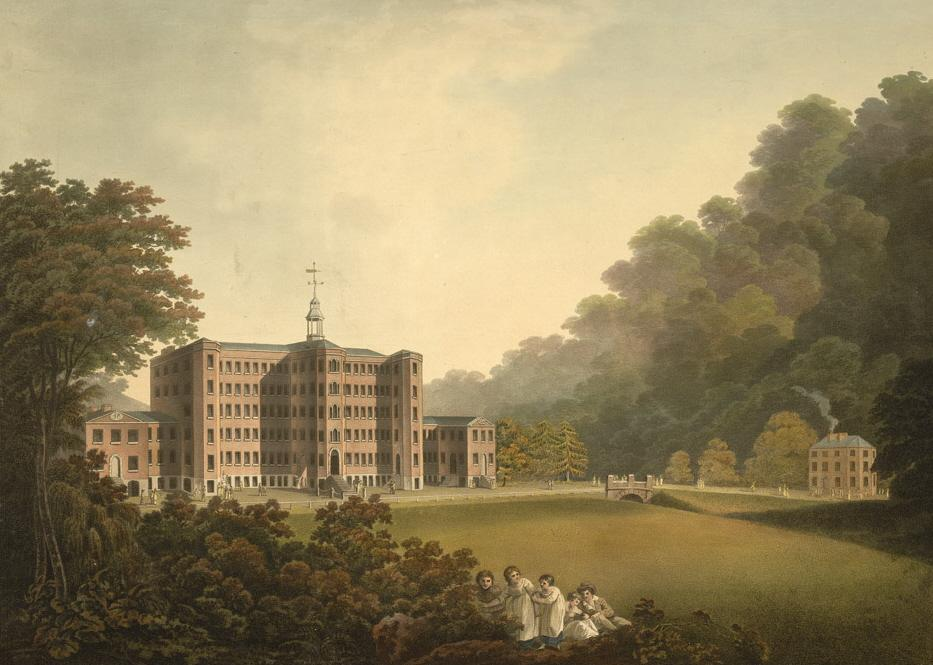
"Mellor Mill" in Marple, Greater Manchester, England, was constructed in 1790–1793 for manufacturing muslin cloth.

Opium Godown (Storehouse) in Patna, Bihar (c. 1814). Patna was the centre of the Company opium industry.

Indigo dye factory in Bengal. Bengal was the world's largest producer of natural indigo in the 19th century.

== Justice system ==
Until the British gained control of Bengal in the later part of the 18th century, the system of justice there was presided over by the Nawab of Bengal himself, who, as the chief law officer, Nawāb Nāzim, attended to cases qualifying for capital punishment in his headquarters, Murshidabad. His deputy, the Naib Nāzim, attended to the slightly less important cases. The ordinary lawsuits belonged to the jurisdiction of a hierarchy of court officials consisting of faujdārs, muhtasils, and kotwāls. In the rural areas, or the Mofussil, the zamindars—the rural overlords with the hereditary right to collect rent from peasant farmers—also had the power to administer justice. This they did with little routine oversight, being required to report only their judgments in capital punishment cases to the Nawāb.

By the mid-18th century, the East India Company had completed a century and a half of presence in India as a trading company, and had a burgeoning presence in the three presidency towns of Madras, Bombay, and Calcutta. During this time, the successive Royal Charters had gradually given the East India Company more power to administer justice in these towns. In the charter granted by Charles II in 1683, the company was given the power to establish "courts of judicature" in locations of its choice, each court consisting of a lawyer and two merchants. This right was renewed in the subsequent charters granted by James II and William III in 1686 and 1698 respectively. In 1726, however, the Court of Directors of the Company felt that more customary justice was necessary for European residents in the presidency towns, and petitioned the King to establish Mayor's Courts. The petition was approved and Mayor's courts, each consisting of a Mayor and nine aldermen, and each having jurisdiction in lawsuits between Europeans, were created in Fort William (Calcutta), Madras, and Bombay. Judgments handed down by a Mayor's Court could be disputed with an appeal to the respective Presidency government and, when the amount disputed was greater than Rs. 4,000, with a further appeal to the King-in-Council. In 1753, the Mayor's courts were renewed under a revised letters patent; in addition, Courts of Requests for lawsuits involving amounts less than Rs. 20 were introduced. Both types of courts were regulated by the Court of Directors of the East India Company. After its victory in the Battle of Buxar, the Company obtained in 1765 the Diwāni of Bengal, the right not only to collect revenue, but also to administer civil justice in Bengal. The administration of criminal justice, the Nizāmat or Faujdāri, however, remained with the Nawāb, and for criminal cases the prevailing Islamic law remained in place. However, the company's new duties associated with the Diwāni were leased out to the Indian officials who had formerly performed them. This makeshift arrangement continued—with much accompanying disarray—until 1771, when the Court of Directors of the Company decided to obtain for the company the jurisdiction of both criminal and civil cases.

Soon afterwards Warren Hastings arrived in Calcutta as the first Governor-General of the company's Indian dominions and resolved to overhaul the company's organization and, in particular, its judicial affairs. In the interior, or Mofussil, diwāni adālats, or a civil courts of first instance, were constituted in each district; these courts were presided over by European Zilā judges employed by the company, who were assisted in the interpretation of customary Indian law by Hindu pandits and Muslim qazis. For small claims, however, Registrars and Indian commissioners, known as Sadr Amīns and Munsifs, were appointed. These in their turn were supervised by provincial civil courts of appeal constituted for such purpose, each consisting of four British judges. All these were under the authority of the Sadr Diwāni Adālat, or the Chief Civil Court of Appeals, consisting of the Governor of the Presidency and his Council, assisted by Indian officers. Similarly for criminal cases, Mofussil nizāmat adālats, or Provincial courts of criminal judicature, were created in the interior; these again consisted of Indian court officers (pandits and qazis), who were supervised by officials of the company. Also constituted were courts of circuit with appellate jurisdiction in criminal cases, which were usually presided over by the judges of the civil appellate courts. All these too were under a Sadr Nizāmat Adālat or a Chief Court of Criminal Appeal.

Around this time, the business affairs of the East India Company began to draw increased scrutiny in the House of Commons. After receiving a report by a committee, which condemned the Mayor's Courts, the Crown issued a charter for a new judicial system in the Bengal Presidency. The British Parliament consequently enacted the Regulating Act 1773 under which the King-in-Council created a Supreme Court in the Presidency town, i.e. Fort William. The tribunal consisted of one Chief Justice and three puisne judges; all four judges were to be chosen from barristers. The Supreme Court supplanted the Mayor's Court; however, it left the Court of Requests in place. Under the charter, the Supreme Court, moreover, had the authority to exercise all types of jurisdiction in the region of Bengal, Bihar, and Odisha, with the only caveat that in situations where the disputed amount was in excess of Rs. 4,000, their judgment could be appealed to the Privy Council. Both the Act and the charter said nothing about the relation between the judiciary (Supreme Court) and the executive branch (Governor-General); equally, they were silent on the Adālats (both Diwāni and Nizāmat) created by Warren Hastings just the year before. In the new Supreme Court, the civil and criminal cases alike were interpreted and prosecuted accorded to English law; in the Sadr Adālats, however, the judges and law-officers did not know English law, and were required only, by the Governor-General's order, "to proceed according to equity, justice, and good conscience, unless Hindu or Muhammadan law was in point, or some Regulation expressly applied".

There was a good likelihood, therefore, that the Supreme Court and the Sadr Adālats would act in opposition to each other and, predictably, many disputes resulted. Hastings' premature attempt to appoint the Chief Justice, Sir Elijah Impey, an old schoolmate from Winchester, to the bench of the Sadr Diwāni Adālat, only complicated the situation further. The appointment had to be annulled in 1781 by a parliamentary intervention with the enactment of the Declaration Act 1781. The Act exempted the Executive Branch from the jurisdiction of the Supreme Court. It recognised the independent existence of the Sadr Adālats and all subsidiary courts of the company. Furthermore, it headed off future legal turf wars by prohibiting the Supreme Court from having any jurisdiction in matters of revenue (Diwāni) or Regulations of the Government enacted by the British Parliament. This state of affairs continued until 1797, when the East India Act 1797 (37 Geo. 3. c. 142) extended the jurisdiction of the Supreme Court to the province of Benares (which had since been added to the company's dominions) and "all places for the time being included in Bengal". With the creation of the Ceded and Conquered Provinces in 1805, the jurisdiction would extend as far west as Delhi. In the other two presidencies, Madras and Bombay, a similar course of legal changes unfolded; there, however, the Mayor's Courts were first strengthened to Recorder's Courts by adding a legal president to the bench. The Supreme Courts in Madras and Bombay were finally established in 1801 and 1823, respectively. Madras Presidency was also unusual in being the first to rely on village headmen and panchāyats for cases involving small claims. This judicial system in the three presidencies was to survive the company's rule, the next major change coming only in 1861.

The house of Sir Thomas Strange, who in 1800 became the first Chief Justice of the Fort of St. George (Madras) and wrote Elements of Hindu Law (1825).

An 1833 Lithograph of the Sadr Diwāni Adālat, the Chief Civil Court for Indians, on Chowringhee Road, Calcutta.

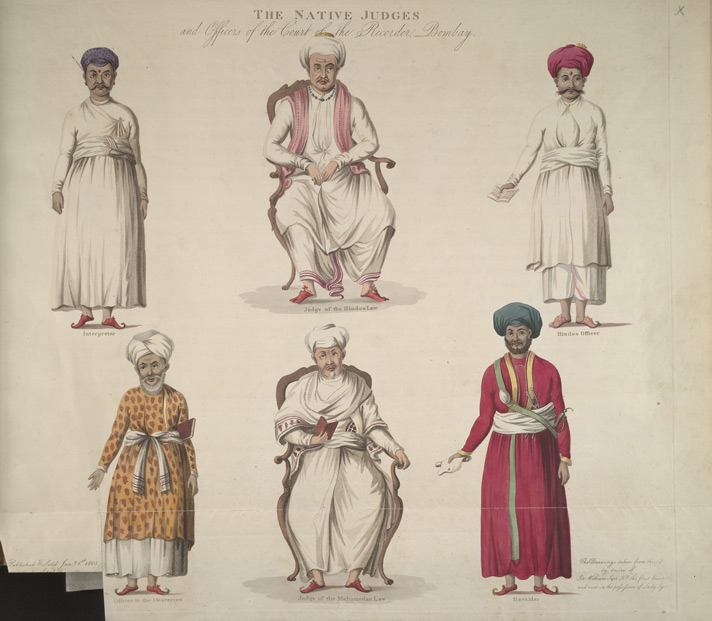
Coloured engraving of the judges and officers of Hindu (top row) and Muslim (bottom row) law in the Recorder Court in Bombay, 1805.

The Court-House Building on Apollo Street, Bombay (third building on left, just beyond the domed Ice House) shown in 1850.

== Education ==
Education of Indians had become a topic of interest among East India Company officials from the outset of the company's rule in Bengal. In the last two decades of the 18th century and the first decade of the nineteenth, Company officials pursued a policy of conciliation towards the native culture of its new dominion, especially in relation to education policy. During the 19th century, the Indian literacy rates were rumoured to be less than half of post independence levels which were 18.33% in 1951. The policy was pursued in the aid of three goals: "to sponsor Indians in their own culture, to advance knowledge of India, and to employ that knowledge in government".

The first goal was supported by some administrators, such as Warren Hastings, who envisaged the company as the successor of a great Empire, and saw the support of vernacular learning as only befitting that role. In 1781, Hastings founded the Madrasa 'Aliya, an institution in Calcutta for the study of Arabic and Persian languages, and Islamic law. A few decades later, a related perspective appeared among the governed population, one that was expressed by the conservative Bengali reformer Radhakanta Deb as the "duty of the Rulers of Countries to preserve and Customs and the religions of their subjects".

The second goal was motivated by the concerns among some Company officials about being seen as foreign rulers. They argued that the company should try to win over its subjects by outdoing the region's previous rulers in the support of indigenous learning. Guided by this belief, the Benares Sanskrit College was founded in Varanasi in 1791 during the administration of Lord Cornwallis. The promotion of knowledge of Asia had attracted scholars as well to the company's service. Earlier, in 1784, the Asiatick Society had been founded in Calcutta by William Jones, a puisne judge in the newly established Supreme Court of Bengal. Soon, Jones was to advance his famous thesis on the common origin of Indo-European languages.

The third related goal grew out of the philosophy then current among some Company officials that they would themselves become better administrators if they were better versed in the languages and cultures of India. It led in 1800 to the founding of the College of Fort William, in Calcutta by Lord Wellesley, the then Governor-General. The college was later to play an important role both in the development of modern Indian languages and in the Bengal Renaissance. Advocates of these related goals were termed "Orientalists". The Orientalist group was led by Horace Hayman Wilson. Many leading Company officials, such as Thomas Munro and Montstuart Elphinstone, were influenced by the Orientalist ethos and felt that the company's government in India should be responsive to Indian expectations. The Orientalist ethos would prevail in education policy well into the 1820s, and was reflected in the founding of the Poona Sanskrit College in Pune in 1821 and the Calcutta Sanskrit College in 1824.

The Orientalists were, however, soon opposed by advocates of an approach that has been termed Anglicist. The Anglicists supported instruction in the English language in order to impart to Indians what they considered modern Western knowledge. Prominent among them were evangelicals who, after 1813—when the company's territories were opened to Christian missionaries—were interested in spreading Christian belief; they also believed in using theology to promote liberal social reform, such as the abolition of slavery. Among them was Charles Grant, the Chairman of the East India Company. Grant supported state-sponsored education in India 20 years before a similar system was set up in Britain. Among Grant's close evangelical friends were William Wilberforce, a prominent abolitionist and member of the British Parliament, and Sir John Shore, the Governor-General of India from 1793 to 1797. During this period, many Scottish Presbyterian missionaries also supported the British rulers in their efforts to spread English education and established many reputed colleges like Scottish Church College (1830), Wilson College (1832), Madras Christian College (1837), and Elphinstone College (1856).

However, the Anglicists also included utilitarians, led by James Mill, who had begun to play an important role in fashioning Company policy. The utilitarians believed in the moral worth of an education that aided the good of society and promoted instruction in useful knowledge. Such useful instruction to Indians had the added consequence of making them more suitable for the company's burgeoning bureaucracy. By the early 1830s, the Anglicists had the upper hand in devising education policy in India. Many utilitarian ideas were employed in Thomas Babington Macaulay's Minute on Indian Education of 1835. The Minute, which later aroused great controversy, was to influence education policy in India well into the next century.

Since English was increasingly being employed as the language of instruction, Persian was abolished as the official language of the company's administration and courts by 1837. However, bilingual education was proving to be popular as well, and some institutions such as the Poona Sanskrit College commenced teaching both Sanskrit and English. Charles Grant's son, Sir Robert Grant, who in 1834 was appointed Governor of the Bombay Presidency, played an influential role in the planning of the first medical college in Bombay, which after his unexpected death was named Grant Medical College when it was established in 1845. During 1852–1853, some citizens of Bombay sent petitions to the British Parliament in support of both establishing and adequately funding university education in India. The petitions resulted in the Education Dispatch of 1854 sent by Sir Charles Wood, the President of the Board of Control of the East India Company, the chief official on Indian affairs in the British government, to Lord Dalhousie, the then Governor-General of India. The dispatch outlined a broad plan of state-sponsored education for India, which included:

1. Establishing a Department of Public Instruction in each presidency or province of British India.
2. Establishing universities modelled on the University of London (as primarily examining institutions for students studying in affiliated colleges) in each of the Presidency towns (i.e. Madras, Bombay, and Calcutta)
3. Establishing teachers-training schools for all levels of instruction
4. Maintaining existing Government colleges and high schools and increasing their number when necessary.
5. Vastly increasing vernacular schools for elementary education in villages.
6. Introducing a system of grants-in-aid for private schools.

The Department of Public Instruction was in place by 1855. In January 1857, the University of Calcutta was established, followed by the University of Bombay in June 1857, and the University of Madras in September 1857. The University of Bombay, for example, consisted of three affiliated institutions: the Elphinstone Institution, the Grant Medical College, and the Poona Sanskrit College. The company's administration also founded high schools en masse in the different provinces and presidencies, and the policy was continued during Crown rule, which commenced in 1858. By 1861, 230,000 students were attending public educational institutions in the four provinces (the three Presidencies and North-Western Provinces), of whom 200,000 were in primary schools. Over 5,000 primary schools and 142 secondary schools had been established in these provinces. Earlier, during the Indian rebellion of 1857, some civilian leaders, such as Khan Bhadur Khan of Bareilly, had stressed the threat posed to the populace's religions by the new education programmes begun by the company; however, historical statistics have shown that this was not generally the case. For example, in Etawah district in the then North-Western Provinces (present-day Uttar Pradesh), where during the period 1855–1857, nearly 200 primary, middle-, and high-schools had been opened by the company and tax levied on the population, relative calm prevailed and the schools remained open during the rebellion.

A coloured-in photograph (1851) of Hindu College, Calcutta, which had been founded in 1817 by a committee headed by Raja Ram Mohun Roy. In 1855, the Government of the Bengal Presidency renamed it Presidency College and opened it to all students.

An engraving (1844) of a youth, who according to the engraver, Emily Eden, was "a favourite and successful young student at the Hindu College in Calcutta, where scholars acquire a very perfect knowledge of English, and have a familiarity with the best English writers".

An 1844 engraving of Grant Medical College (left) and Sir Jamsetjee Jeejeebhoy Hospital (right background) in Bombay made by G. R. Sargeant the year before the medical college was formally opened.

An 1855 photograph of the same two institutions. In 1857, Grant Medical College became one of three institutions affiliated with the newly established University of Bombay. The college was funded partly by the Jeejeebhoy family and partly by the East India Company.

== Social reform ==
In the first half of the 19th century, the British legislated reforms against what they considered were iniquitous Indian practices. In most cases, the legislation alone was unable to change Indian society sufficiently for it to absorb both the ideal and the ethic underpinning the reform. For example, upper-caste Hindu society in the Indo-Aryan speaking regions of India had long looked askance at the remarriage of widows to protect both what it considered family honour and family property. Even adolescent widows were expected to live a life of austerity and denial. The Hindu Widows' Remarriage Act, 1856, enacted in the waning years of Company rule, provided legal safeguards against loss of certain forms of inheritance for a remarrying Hindu widow, though not of the inheritance due her from her deceased husband. However, very few widows actually remarried. Some Indian reformers, such as Raja Ram Mohan Roy, Ishwar Chandra Vidyasagar, even offered money to men who would take widows as brides, but these men often deserted their new wives.

== Post and telegraph ==
=== Postal services ===
Before 1837, the East India Company's dominions in India had no universal public postal service, one that was shared by all regions. Although courier services did exist, connecting the more important towns with their respective seats of provincial government (i.e. the Presidency towns of Fort William (Calcutta), Fort St. George (Madras), and Bombay), private individuals were, upon payment, only sparingly allowed their use. That situation changed in 1837, when, by Act XVII of that year, a public post, run by the company's Government, was established in the company's territory in India. Post offices were established in the principal towns and postmasters appointed. The postmasters of the Presidency towns oversaw a few provincial post offices in addition to being responsible for the main postal services between the provinces. By contrast, the District collectors (originally, collectors of land-tax) directed the District post offices, including their local postal services. Postal services required payment in cash, to be made in advance, with the amount charged usually varying with weight and distance. For example, the charge of sending a letter from Calcutta to Bombay was one rupee; however, that from Calcutta to Agra was 12 annas (or three-quarters of a rupee) for each tola (three-eighths of an ounce).

After the recommendations of the commission appointed in 1850 to evaluate the Indian postal system were received, Act XVII of 1837 was superseded by the Indian Postal Act of 1854. Under its provisions, the entire postal department was headed by a Director-General, and the duties of a Postmaster-General were set apart from those of a Presidency Postmaster; the former administered the postal system of the larger provinces (such as the Bombay Presidency or the North-Western Provinces), whereas the latter attended to the less important Provinces (such as Ajmer-Merwara and the major Political Agencies such as Rajputana). Postage stamps were introduced at this time, and the postal rates were fixed by weight, dependent no longer on the distance travelled in the delivery. The lowest inland letter rate was half anna for 1/4 tola, followed by one anna for 1/2 tola, and 2 annas for a tola, a great reduction from the rates of 17 years before. The Indian Post Office delivered letters, newspapers, postcards, book packets, and parcels. These deliveries grew steadily in number; by 1861 (three years after the end of Company rule), a total of 889 post offices had been opened, and almost 43 million letters and over four and a half million newspapers were being delivered annually.

Lithograph of the General Post Office on Chowringhee Street, Calcutta, 1833, four years before the India-wide postal service was established under the Indian Postal Act of 1837.

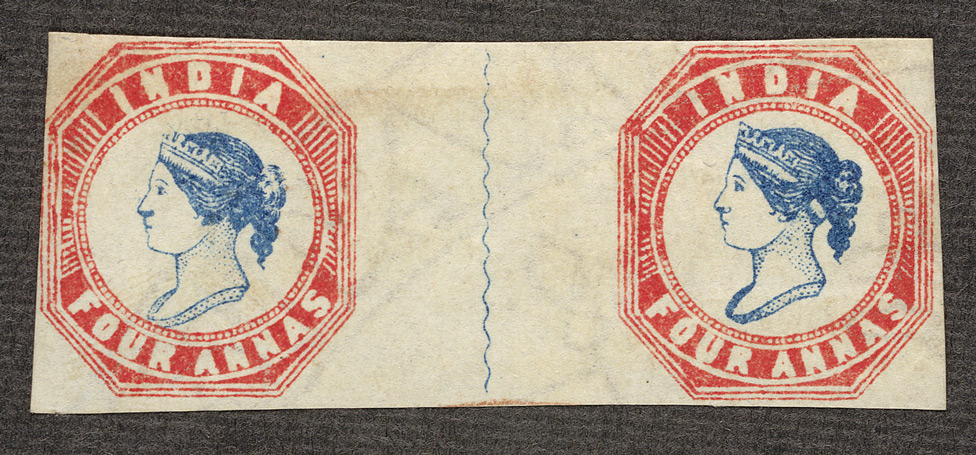
Two four anna stamps issued in 1854. Stamps were issued for the first time for all of British India in 1854. The lowest denomination was 1/2 anna blue, followed by 1 anna red, and 4 annas blue and red. The stamps were printed from lithographic stones at the Surveyor-General's Office in Calcutta.

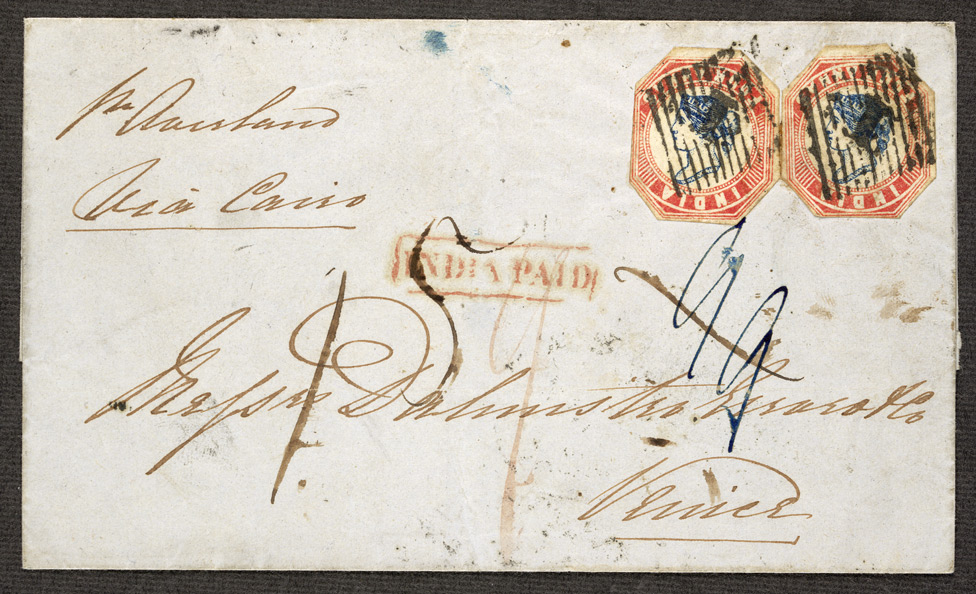
Since the four anna stamps were composed of two colours, they required two different printings, one for Queen Victoria's head in blue, and the other for the surrounding red frame. In these rare stamps, shown on a letter mailed from Bombay to Venice, the head was accidentally oriented upside-down in relation to the frame.

A semaphore "telegraph" signalling tower in Silwar (Bihar), 13 February 1823, thirty years before electric telegraphy was rapidly introduced into India by the East India Company.

=== Telegraphy ===
Before the advent of electric telegraphy, the word "telegraph" had been used for semaphore signalling. During the period 1820–1830, the East India Company's Government in India seriously considered constructing signalling towers ("telegraph" towers), each a hundred feet high and separated from the next by eight miles, along the entire distance from Calcutta to Bombay. Although such towers were built in Bengal and Bihar, the India-wide semaphore network never took off. By mid-century, electric telegraphy had become viable, and hand signalling obsolete.

W. B. O'Shaughnessy, a professor of chemistry in the Calcutta Medical College, received permission in 1851 to conduct a trial run for a telegraph service from Calcutta to Diamond Harbour along the Hooghly River. Four telegraph offices, mainly for shipping-related business, were also opened along the river that year. The telegraph receiver used in the trial was a galvanoscope of O'Shaughnessy's design and manufactured in India. When the experiment was deemed to be a success a year later, the Governor-General of India, Lord Dalhousie, sought permission from the Court of Directors of the company for the construction of telegraph lines from "Calcutta to Agra, Agra to Bombay, Agra to Peshawar, and Bombay to Madras, extending in all over 3,050 miles and including forty-one offices". The permission was soon granted; by February 1855 all the proposed telegraph lines had been constructed and were being used to send paid messages. O'Shaughnessy's instrument was used all over India until early 1857, when it was supplanted by the Morse instrument. By 1857, the telegraph network had expanded to 4,555 miles of lines and sixty-two offices, and had reached as far as the hill station of Ootacamund in the Nilgiri Hills and the port of Calicut on the southwest coast of India. During the Indian rebellion of 1857, more than seven hundred miles of telegraph lines were destroyed by the rebel forces, mainly in the North-Western Provinces. The East India Company was nevertheless able to use the remaining intact lines to warn many outposts of impending disturbances. The political value of the new technology was, thus, driven home to the company, and, in the following year, not only were the destroyed lines rebuilt, but the network was expanded further by 2,000 miles.

O'Shaughnessy's experimental set-up of 1851–52 consisted of both overhead and underground lines; the latter included underwater ones that crossed two rivers, the Hooghly and the Haldi. The overhead line was constructed by welding uninsulated iron rods, 13 1/2 feet long and 3/8 inch wide, end to end. These lines, which weighed 1,250 pounds per mile, were held aloft by fifteen-foot lengths of bamboo, planted into the ground at equal intervals—200 to the mile—and covered with a layer each of coal tar and pitch for insulation. The underwater cables had been manufactured in England and consisted of copper wire covered with gutta-percha. Furthermore, to protect the cables from dragging ship anchors, the cables were attached to the links of a 7/8-inch-thick (22 mm) chain cable. An underwater cable of length 2,070 yards was laid across the Hooghly river at Diamond Harbour, and another, 1,400 yards long, was laid across the Haldi at Kedgeree.

Work on the long lines from Calcutta to Peshawar (through Agra), Agra to Bombay, and Bombay to Madras began in 1853. The conducting material chosen for these lines was now lighter, and the support stronger. The wood used for the support consisted of teak, sal, fir, ironwood, or blackwood (Terminalia elata), and was either fashioned into whole posts, or used in attachments to iron screw-piles or masonry columns. Some sections had uniformly strong support; one such was the 322-mile Bombay-Madras line, which was supported by granite obelisks sixteen feet high. Other sections had less secure support, consisting, in some cases, of sections of toddy palm, insulated with pieces of sal wood fastened to their tops. Some of the conducting wires or rods were insulated, the insulating material being manufactured in either India or England; other stretches of wire remained uninsulated. By 1856, iron tubes had begun to be employed to provide support, and would see increased use in the second half of the 19th century all over India.

The first Telegraph Act for India was Parliament's Act XXXIV of 1854. When the public telegram service was first set up in 1855, the charge was fixed at one rupee for every sixteen words (including the address) for every 400 miles of transmission. The charges were doubled for telegrammes sent between 6 PM and 6 AM. These rates would remain fixed until 1882. In the year 1860–61, two years after the end of Company rule, India had 11,093 miles of telegraph lines and 145 telegraph offices. That year telegrams totalling Rs. 500,000 in value were sent by the public; the working expense of the Indian Telegraph Department was Rs. 1.4 million, and the capital expenditure until the end of the year totalled Rs. 6.5 million.

== Railways ==
The first inter-city railway service in England, the Stockton and Darlington Railway, had been established in 1825; in the following decade other inter-city railways were rapidly constructed between cities in England. In 1845, the Court of Directors of the East India Company forwarded to the Governor-General of India, Lord Dalhousie, several applications they had received from private contractors in England for the construction of a wide-ranging railway network in India, and requested a feasibility report. They added that, in their view, the enterprise would be profitable only if large sums of money could be raised for the construction. The Court was concerned that in addition to the usual difficulties encountered in the construction of this new form of transportation, India might present some unique problems, among which they counted floods, tropical storms in coastal areas, damage by "insects and luxuriant tropical vegetation", and the difficulty of finding qualified technicians at a reasonable cost. It was suggested, therefore, that three experimental lines be constructed and their performance evaluated.

Contracts were awarded in 1849 to the East Indian Railway Company to construct a 120-mile railway from Howrah-Calcutta to Raniganj; to the Great Indian Peninsular Railway Company for a service from Bombay to Kalyan, thirty miles away; and to the Madras Railway Company for a line from Madras city to Arkonam, a distance of some thirty nine miles. Although construction began first, in 1849, on the East Indian Railways line, with an outlay of £1 million, it was the first leg of the Bombay-Kalyan line—a 21-mile stretch from Bombay to Thane—that, in 1853, was the first to be completed (see picture below).

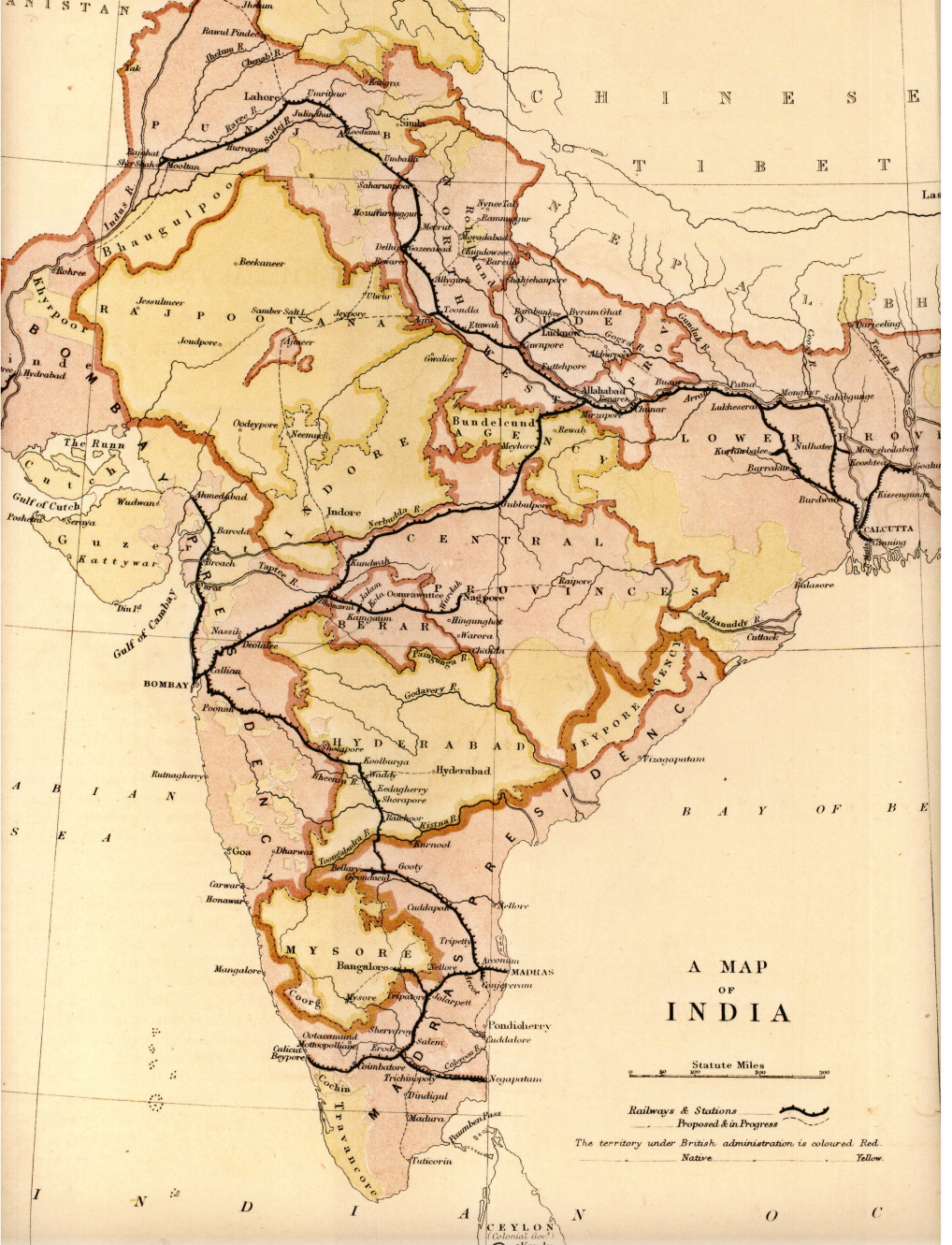
Map of the completed and planned railway lines in India in 1871, thirteen years after the end of Company rule.

The feasibility of a train network in India was comprehensively discussed by Lord Dalhousie in his Railway minute of 1853. The Governor-General vigorously advocated the quick and widespread introduction of railways in India, pointing to their political, social, and economic advantages. He recommended that a network of trunk lines be first constructed connecting the inland regions of each presidency with its chief port as well as each presidency with several others. His recommended trunk lines included the following ones: (i) from Calcutta, in the Bengal Presidency, on the eastern coast to Lahore in the north-western region of the Punjab, annexed just three years before; (ii) from Agra in north-central India (in, what was still being called North-Western Provinces) to Bombay city on the western coast; (iii) from Bombay to Madras city on the southeastern coast; and (iv) from Madras to the southwestern Malabar coast (see map above). The proposal was soon accepted by the Court of Directors.

During this time, work had been proceeding on the experimental lines as well. The first leg of the East Indian Railway line, a broad gauge railway, from Howrah to Pandua, was opened in 1854 (see picture of locomotive below), and the entire line up to Raniganj would become functional by the time of the Indian rebellion of 1857. The Great Indian Peninsular Railway was permitted to extend its experimental line to Poona. This extension required planning for the steep rise in the Bor Ghat valley in the Western Ghats, a section 15 3/4 miles long with an ascent of 1,831 feet. Construction began in 1856 and was completed in 1863, and, in the end, the line required a total of twenty five tunnels and fifteen miles of gradients (inclines) of 1 in 50 or steeper, the most extreme being the Bor Ghat Incline, a distance of 1 3/4 miles at a gradient of 1 in 37 (see picture above).

Each of the three companies (and later five others that were given contracts in 1859) was a joint stock company domiciled in England with its financial capital raised in pounds sterling. Each company was guaranteed a 5 per cent return on its capital outlay and, in addition, a share of half the profits. Although the Government of India had no capital expenditure other than the provision of the underlying land free of charge, it had the onus of continuing to provide the 5 percent return in the event of net loss, and soon all anticipation of profits would fall by the wayside as the outlays would mount.

The technology of railway construction was still new, and there was no railway engineering expertise in India; consequently, all engineers had to be brought in from England. These engineers were unfamiliar not only with the language and culture of India, but also with the physical aspect of the land itself and its concomitant engineering requirements. Moreover, never before had such a large and complex construction project been undertaken in India, and no pool of semi-skilled labour was already organised to aid the engineers. The work, therefore, proceeded in fits and starts—many practical trials followed by a final construction that was undertaken with great caution and care—producing an outcome that was later criticised as being "built to a standard which was far in excess of the needs of the time". The Government of India's administrators, moreover, made up in their attention to the fine details of expenditure and management what they lacked in professional expertise. The resulting delays soon led to the appointment of a Committee of the House of Commons in 1857–58 to investigate the matter. However, by the time the Committee concluded that all parties needed to honour the spirit rather than the letter of the contracts, Company rule in India had ended.

Although railway construction had barely begun in the last years of this rule, its foundations had been laid, and it would proceed apace for much of the next half century. By the turn of the 20th century, India would have over 28,000 miles of railways connecting most interior regions to the ports of Karachi, Bombay, Madras, Calcutta, Chittagong, and Rangoon, and together they would constitute the fourth-largest railway network in the world.

Photograph (1855) showing the construction of the Bhor Ghaut incline bridge, Bombay; the incline was conceived by George Clark, the Chief Engineer in the East India Company's Government of Bombay.

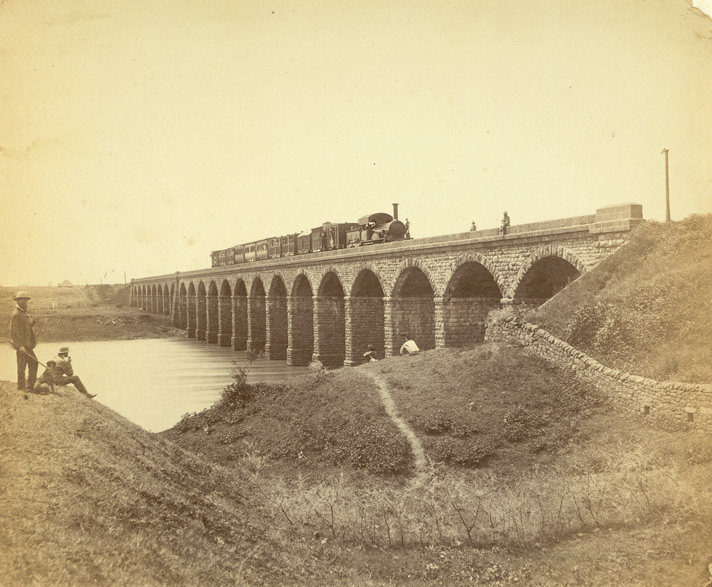
Photograph (1858) of the Dapoorie viaduct over the Mula River near Poona in Bombay Presidency.

Photograph (1897) of the first locomotive, shown on the right and christened "multum in parvo" (barely visible on the wheel casing), which was used by the East Indian Railway Company in 1854 on its 23-mile line from Howrah to Pandua.

The trunk lines proposed by the Governor-General of India, Lord Dalhousie in his Railway minute of 1853 (shown in red on a 1908 railway map of India).

== Canals ==
The first irrigation works undertaken during the East India Company's rule began in 1817. Consisting chiefly of extensions or reinforcements of previous Indian works, these projects were limited to the plains north of Delhi and to the river deltas of the Madras Presidency.

In plains above Delhi, the mid-14th century Sultan of Delhi, Firuz Shah Tughlaq, had constructed the 150-mile-long Western Jamna Canal. Taking off from the right bank of the Jamna river early in its course, the canal irrigated the Sultan's territories in the Hissar region of Eastern Punjab. By the mid-16th century, however, the fine sediment carried by the Himalayann river had gradually choked the canal. Desilted and reopened several decades later by Akbar the Great, the Western Jamna Canal was itself tapped by Akbar's grandson Shah Jahan, and some of its water was diverted to Delhi. During this time, another canal was cut off the river. The 129-mile Eastern Jamna Canal or Doab Canal, which took off from the left bank of the Jamna, also high in its course, presented a qualitatively different difficulty. Since it was routed through steeply sloped land, its flow was difficult to control, and it never operated efficiently. With the decline of the Mughal Empire's power in the 18th century, both canals fell into disrepair. The Western Jamna Canal was repaired by British Army engineers, and it reopened in 1820. The Doab Canal was reopened in 1830; its considerable renovation involved raising the embankment by an average height of 9 ft for some 40 miles.

The Ganges Canal highlighted in red stretching between its headworks off the Ganges river in Hardwar and its confluence with the Jumna river below Cawnpore (now Kanpur).

Farther west in the Punjab region, the 130-mile long Hasli Canal, had been constructed by previous rulers. Taking off from the Ravi River and supplying water to the cities of Lahore and Amritsar, this left-bank canal was extended by the British in the Bari Doab Canal works during 1850–1857. The Punjab region, moreover, had much rudimentary irrigation by "inundation canals". Consisting of open cuts along the sides of rivers and unregulated, the inundation canals had been used in both the Punjab and Sindh for many centuries. Many such canals in Multan, Dera Ghazi Khan, and Muzaffargarh were still working efficiently at the time of the British annexation of the Punjab in 1849.

The first new British work—with no Indian antecedents—was the Ganges Canal built between 1842 and 1854. Contemplated first by Col. John Russell Colvin in 1836, it did not at first elicit much enthusiasm from its eventual architect, Sir Proby Cautley, who baulked at the idea of cutting a canal through extensive low-lying land to reach the drier upland destination. However, after the Agra famine of 1837–1838, during which the East India Company's administration spent Rs. 2,300,000 on famine relief, the idea of a canal became more attractive to the company's Court of Directors. In 1839, the Governor-General of India, Lord Auckland, with the Court's assent, granted funds to Cautley for a complete survey of the swath of land that underlay and fringed the projected course of the canal. The Court of Directors, moreover, considerably enlarged the scope of the projected canal, which, in consequence of the severity and geographical extent of the famine, they now deemed to be the entire Doab region.

The enthusiasm, however, proved to be short-lived. Auckland's successor as Governor-General, Lord Ellenborough, appeared less receptive to large-scale public works, and during his tenure withheld major funds for the project. Only in 1844, when a new Governor-General, Lord Hardinge, was appointed, did official enthusiasm and funds return to the Ganges canal project. Although the intervening impasse had seemingly affected Cautley's health and required him to return to Britain in 1845 for recuperation, his European sojourn allowed him to study contemporary hydraulic works in Great Britain and Italy. By the time of his return to India even more supportive men were at the helm, both in the North-Western Provinces, with James Thomason as Lt. Governor, and in British India with Lord Dalhousie as Governor-General. Canal construction, under Cautley's supervision, now went into high activity. A 350-mile long canal, with another 300 miles of branch lines, eventually stretched between the headworks in Hardwar and—after splitting into two branches at Nanau near Aligarh—the confluence with the Ganges at Cawnpore (now Kanpur) and with the Jumna (now Yamuna) main stem at Etawah. The Ganges Canal, which required a total capital outlay of £2.15 million, was officially opened in 1854 and became fully operational in 1857. According to historian Ian Stone:

It was the largest canal ever attempted in the world, five times greater in its length than all the main irrigating lines of Lombardy and Egypt put together, and longer by a third than even the largest USA navigation canal, the Pennsylvania Canal.

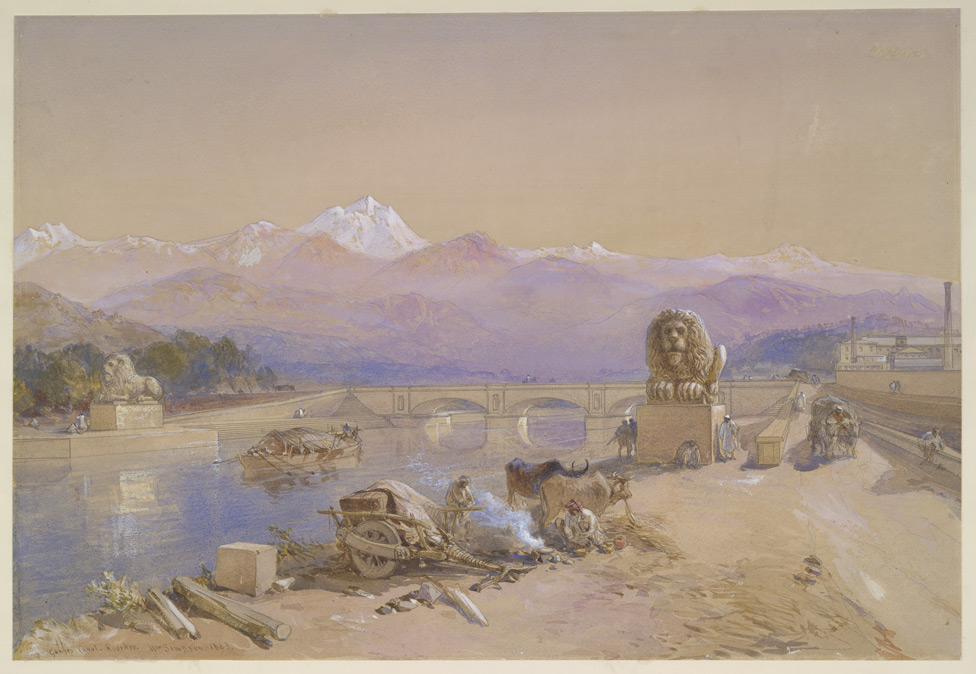
Watercolor (1863) titled "The Ganges Canal, Roorkee, Saharanpur district (U.P.)". The canal was the brainchild of Sir Proby Cautley; construction began in 1840, and the canal was opened by Governor-General Lord Dalhousie in April 1854

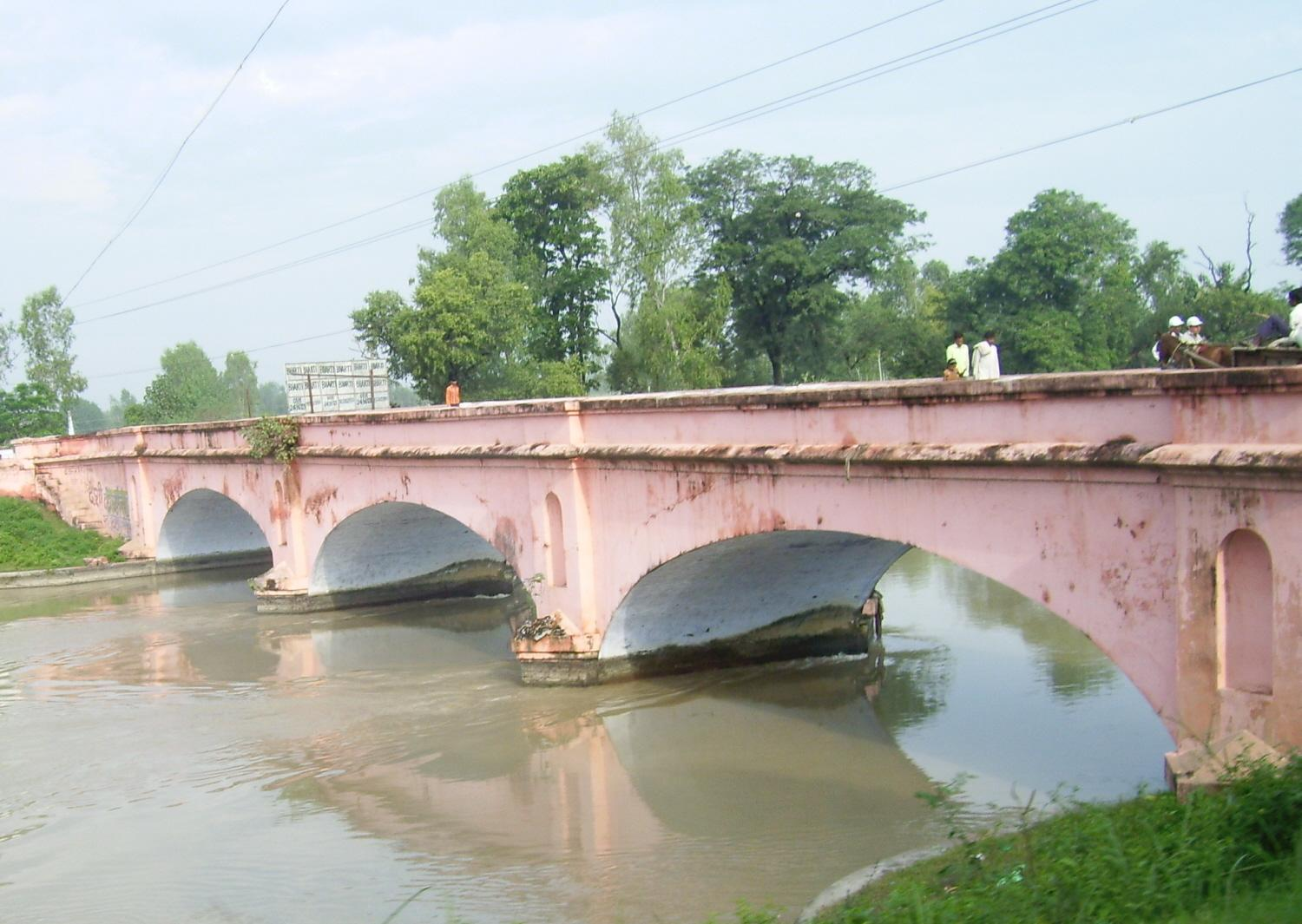
Photograph (2008) of an East India Company-era (1854) bridge on the Ganges Canal near Roorkee, Uttar Pradesh, India.

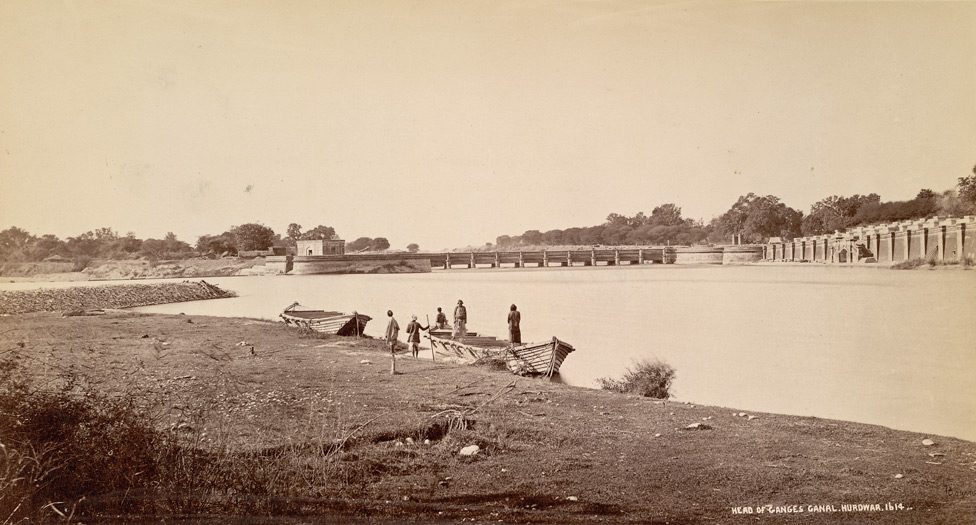
Photograph (1860) of the head works of the Ganges Canal in Haridwar taken by Samuel Bourne

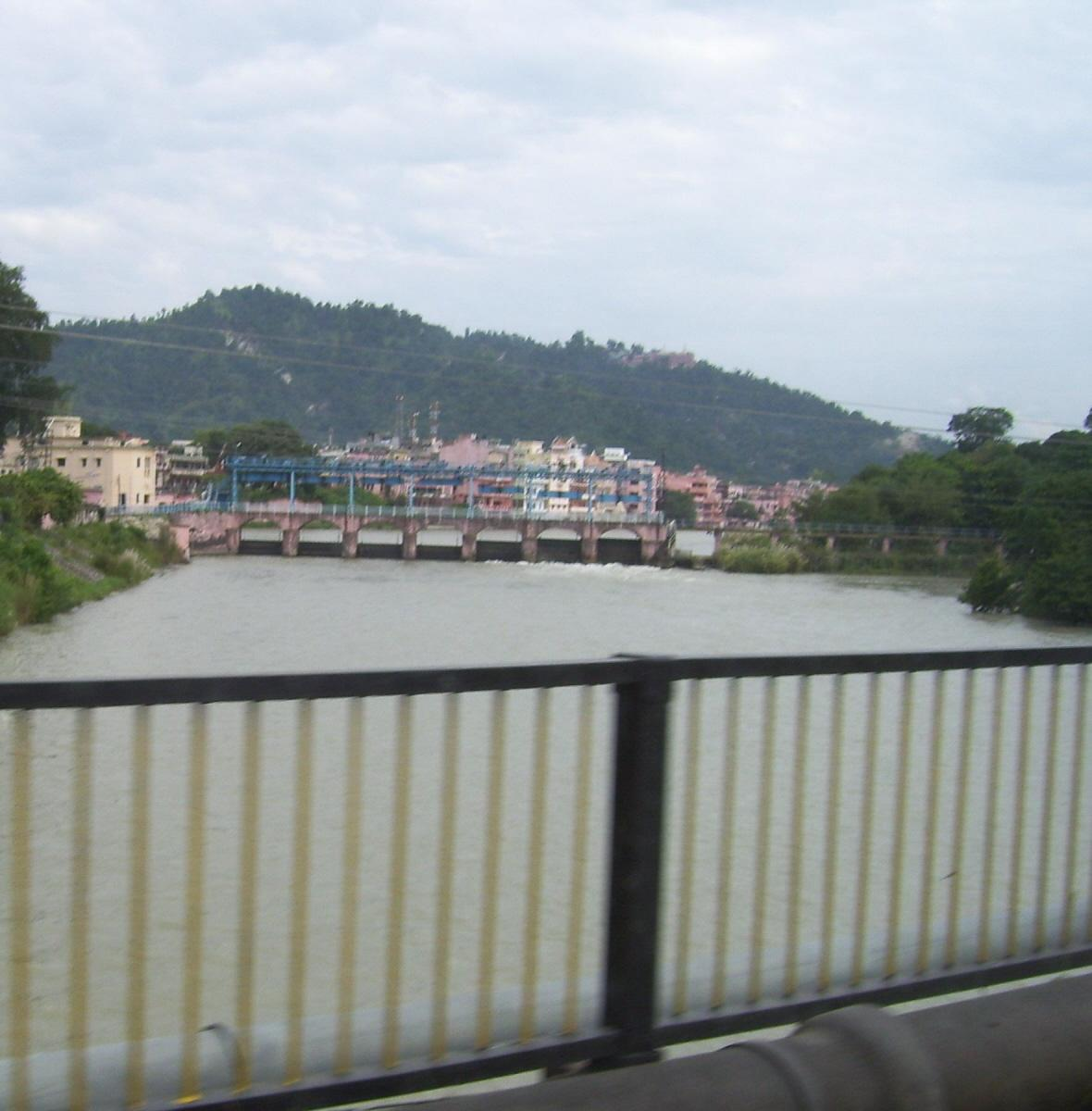
Photograph (2008) of the head works of the Ganges Canal in Haridwar, viewed from the opposite side.

== See also ==
- British Raj
- Presidencies and provinces of British India
- De-industrialisation of India
- Glossary of the British Raj (Urdu words)
- Government of India Act 1858
- Governor-General of India
- History of Bangladesh
- History of India
- History of Pakistan
- Opium Trading in Mumbai
- Secretary of State for India
- The History of British India
