= John Taylor (mathematician) =

English mathematician and traveller

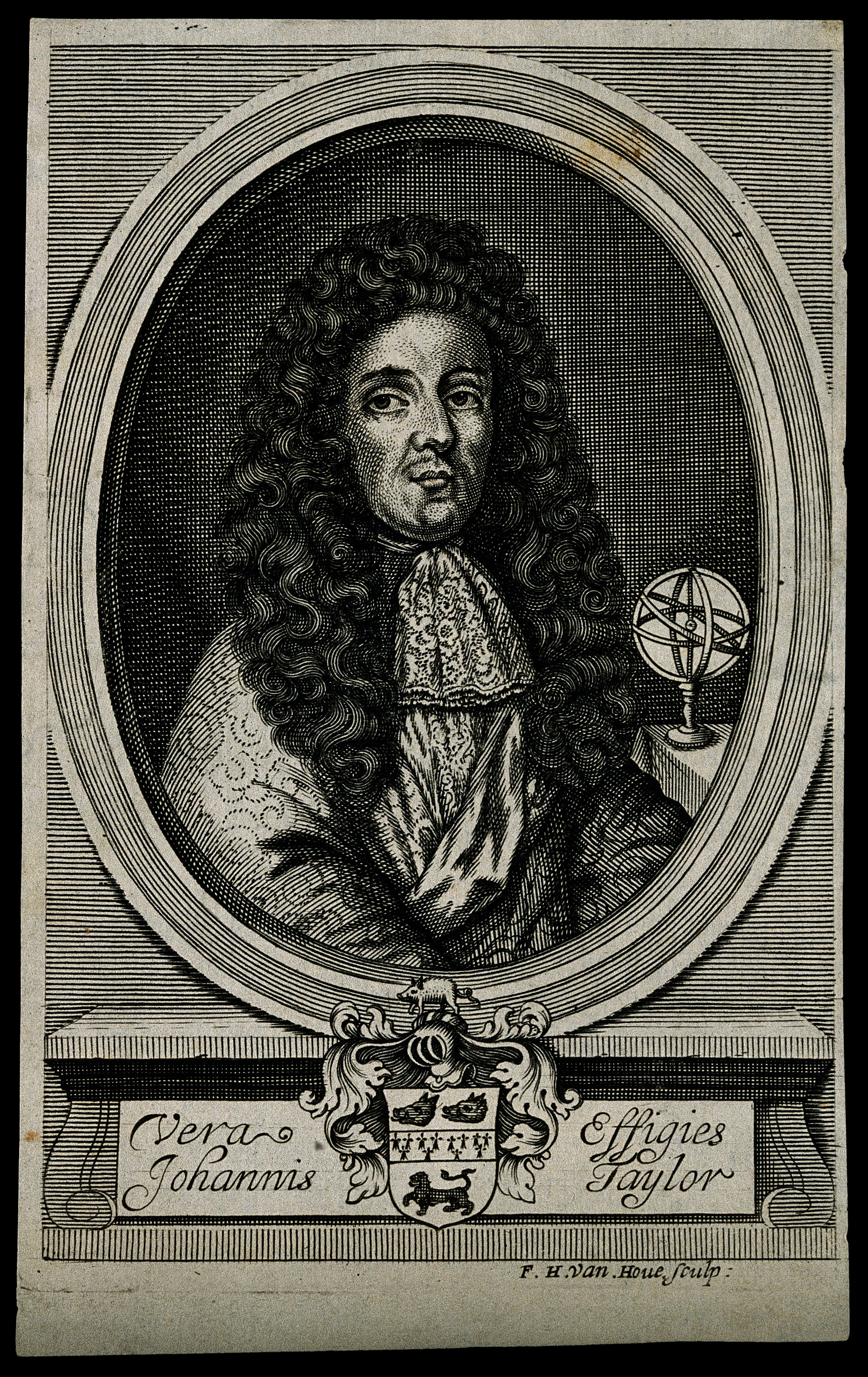
John Taylor. Line engraving by F. H. van Hove, 1687. Wellcome V0005742.jpg

John Taylor (born 1664) was an English mathematician and traveller, and author of a manuscript account of Jamaica.

== Life ==
John Taylor was the son of a minor gentleman from the Isle of Wight. In 1685 Taylor fought for James II against the Monmouth Rebellion. Returning to London to study mathematics and chemistry, he published the textbook Thesaurarium mathematicae in 1686, and married. Shortly after, with his wife pregnant, Taylor left for the Caribbean after an argument with his father-in-law, and arranged passage to Jamaica for himself and his goods, which included the indentures of three felons and some cloth. He arrived in Jamaica at Christmas 1686, selling the three felons for a disappointing £45 profit. Though he stayed for under six months, his Multum in Parvo collected together natural history and social description of the island. After some months and several attacks of the 'dry belly aches', probably lead poisoning from locally distilled rum, he was warned that he should return to England to save his life. By now very short of money, he arranged passage as a captain's clerk on a Royal Navy ship, recording the story of the voyage.

== Multum in Parvo ==
Taylor's manuscript also includes an imaginative mythical version of the history of the island, amounting to fables rather than history, reflecting the stories told by the English settlers to justify their easy conquest of the island and to maintain that their loyalty had always been to the Stuart regime. Robert Venables had led a difficult and inglorious invasion of the island for Cromwell's regime. Taylor reports that when the English fleet arrived in 1655, the Spanish colony had a female Governor, the imaginary Marqueness Seignora Margareta Perez de Guzman, 'an Ancient Lady of Spain.' Taylor says nothing good about women in general, nor about any individual woman. The Marqueness offered to pay great treasures to the invaders to go away, and on their refusal arranged for the gold and silver to be buried with 'perfixt spells over it, soe that it lies still undiscovered, being inchanted by Magique Art'. He reports several stories of ghostly guards on treasure. In fact Venables had negotiated mundane bargains for cassava flour and cattle with the actual Spanish governor, Juan Ramirez de Arellano.

Taylor tells us that the English conquest took only three months, after which 'the Island was solely enjoyed by the English, the Spaniards and Negroes being subdued'. The English conquest was deeply insecure during the six years of guerrilla warfare that Venables' successor had to prosecute. Resistance by Jamaican Maroons, rebel slaves, and runaways continued until the end of slavery. These fables did not mark the limits of reinterpretation; by 1683 the Jamaican Assembly announced that the Cromwellian conquest had occurred 'in the 7th year of His Majestys Reign', though Charles II had been at the time an impoverished exile, and when 'he came to exercise His Royal Authority' the King 'was pleased to own what his Subjects had done which was the same as if he had Commissioned them'.

Multum in Parvo was probably intended for profitable publication. Its fervent and ingenious claims of Stuart loyalty would have been unsuitable after the last Stuart monarch of England was deposed in 1688; its forthright attacks on his wife's family and women in general may also have been unwise in the context of Taylor's return to England. The single manuscript is held in the National Library of Jamaica, and publication was delayed until 2011.

== Back in England ==
Taylor returned to England, though not to the Isle of Wight; he turned his talents to compiling almanacs in Norwich.

== Works ==
- Thesaurarium mathematicae, or, The treasury of mathematicks containing variety of usefull practices in arithmetick, geometry, trigonometry, astronomy, geography, navigation and surveying ... to which is annexed a table of 10000 logarithms, log-sines, and log-tangents, 1686
- Multum in Parvo. Or Taylor's Historie of his Life, and Travells in America and other Parts, MS., 1687. MS. 105, National Library of Jamaica. Published as David Buisseret, ed., Jamaica in 1687: The Taylor Manuscript at the National Library of Jamaica, University of West Indies Press, 2008.
