= Glossary of the British Raj =

The British Raj adopted a range of Indian terms in the administration of British India. The following list is based on a glossary attached to the fifth Report of the Committee of the House of Commons on Indian Affairs, appointed in 1810, comprising Hindustani words commonly used in the administration of the country.

== Origins ==
English language public instruction began in India in the 1830s during the rule of the East India Company: India was then, and is today, one of the most linguistically diverse regions of the world.. In 1835, the replaced Persian as the official language of the Company. Lord Macaulay played a major role in introducing English and Western concepts to education in India. He supported the replacement of Persian by English as the official language, the use of English as the medium of instruction in all schools, and the training of English-speaking Indians as teachers. Throughout the 1840s and 1850s, primary, middle, and high schools were opened in many districts of British India, with most high-schools offering English language instruction in some subjects. In 1857, just before the end of Company rule, universities modelled on the University of London and using English as the medium of instruction were established in Bombay, Calcutta and Madras. During the British Raj, lasting from 1858 to 1947, English language penetration increased throughout India. This was driven in part by the gradually increasing hiring of Indians in the civil services. At the time of India's independence in 1947, English was the only functional lingua franca in the country. It used British spellings and contemporary interpretations, many of which have passed into the English vocabulary.

== A ==
- Adalat, Adawlut: Justice, equity; a court of justice. The terms Dewanny Adawlut, and Foujdarry Adawlut, denote the civil and criminal courts of justice. See Dewanny and Foujdarry.
- Ameer, Meer, Mir, Emir: A nobleman. Ameer-ul-Omrah. Noble of Nobles, Lord of Lords.
- Anna: A piece of money, the sixteenth part of a rupee.
- Aumeen: Trustee, commissioner. A temporary collector or supervisor, appointed to the charge of a country on the removal of a Zemindar, or for any other particular purpose of local investigation or arrangement.
- Aumil: Agent, officer, native collector of revenue. Superintendent of a district or division of a country, either on the part of the government, Zemindar, or renter.
- Aumildar: Agent, the holder of an office. An intendant and collector of the revenue, uniting civil, military, and financial powers, under the Mahomedan government.
- Aurung: A place where goods are manufactured.

== B ==
- Bala-Ghaut: Above the Ghauts, in contradistinction to Payeen-Ghaut, below the Ghauts. The terms are generally applied to the Deccan Plateau, a high tableland in the centre of India, towards its southern extremity.
- Banyan. A Hindu merchant, or shopkeeper. The term Banyan is used in Bengal to denote the native who manages the money concerns of the European, and sometimes serves him as an interpreter. At Madras, the same description of persons is called Dubash, which signifies one who can speak two languages.
- Batta. Deficiency, discount, allowance. Allowance to troops in the field.
- Bazaar: Daily market, or market place.
- Bega: A land measure equal, in Bengal, to about the third part of an acre.
- Begum: A lady, princess, woman of high rank.
- Bice, Vaishya: A man of the third Hindu caste, who by birth is a trader, or husbandman.
- Brahmen, Brahmin, Brahman, Bramin: A divine, a priest; the first Hindoo caste.
- Brinjarrie, Binjary, Benjary, Banjary: A grain merchant.
- Bungalow: The name used in Bengal, for a species of country-house, erected by Europeans.

== C ==
- Caly Yug, Calyoogum: The present, or fourth age of the world, according to the chronology of the Hindus.
- Caste, Cast: A tribe, or class of people.
- Caravan-Serai: The serai of the caravan. See Serai and Choultry.
- Cawzi, Cazi, Kazy: A Mahomedan judge, or justice, who also officiates as a public notary, in attesting deeds, by affixing his seal.
- Cauzy-ul-Cazaut: Judge of judges; the chief judge, or justice.
- Cauvery: The Kaveri river.
- Chandala: One of the names for the most degraded Hindu casts.
- Choky, Chokee: A chair, seat; guard, watch. The station of a guard or watchman. A place where an officer is stationed to receive tolls and customs.
- Chokidar, Chowkidaar: A watchman.
- Choultry: A covered public building, for the accommodation of passengers.
- Chout: A fourth: a fourth part of sums litigated. Mahratta chout; a fourth [xxxii] of the revenues, exacted as tribute by the Mahrattas.
- Chubdar: Staff-bearer. An attendant on a man of rank. He waits with a long staff, plated with silver, announces the approach of visitors, and runs before his master, proclaiming aloud his titles.
- Chunam: Lime.
- Circar: Head of affairs; the state or government; a grand division of a province; a head man; a name used by Europeans in Bengal, to denote the Hindu writer and accountant, employed by themselves, or in the public offices.
- Colluries, Colerees: Saltworks, the places where salt is made.
- Coolites, Cooly: Porter, labourer.
- Coss: A term used by Europeans, to denote a road-measure of about two miles, but differing in different parts of India.
- Crore: A unit in the Indian numbering system equal to 100 lac i.e. ten million or 10^{7} in scientific notation, and written as “1,00,00,000” (rather than “10,000,000”) in the Indian convention of digit grouping.
- Crishnah, Crishna: The Krishna River.
- Csnatriya, Kshatriya, Chetterie, Khetery: A man of the second or military caste.
- Cutcherry: Court of justice; also the public office where the rents are paid, and other business respecting the revenue transacted.
- Cutwal, Katwal: The chief officer of police in a large town or city, and superintendent of the markets.

== D ==
- Dar: Keeper, holder. This word is often joined with another, to denote the holder of a particular office or employment, as Chob-dar, staff-holder; Zemin-dar, land-holder. This compound word, with i, ee, y, added to it, denotes the office, as Zemindar-ee.
- Darogah: A superintendent, or overseer; as of the police, the mint.
- Daum, Dam: A copper coin, the fortieth part of a rupee.
- Deccan: Literally, the south. A term employed by Mahomedan writers, to denote the country between the rivers Nerbuddah and Crishna.
- Decoits: Gang-robbers.
- Decoity, Decoitry: gang-robbery.
- Dewan, Duan: Place of assembly. Native minister of the revenue department; and chief justice, in civil causes, within his jurisdiction; receiver-generad of a province. The term is also used, to designate the principal revenue servant under a European collector, and even of a Zemindar. By this title, the East India Company are receivers-general of the revenues of Bengal, under a grant from the Great Mogul.
- Dewanny, Duannee: The office, or jurisdiction of a Dewan.
- Dewanny Court of Adawlut: A court for trying revenue, and other civil causes.
- Doab, Doowab: Any tract of country included between two rivers.
- Dhobi, Dhoby: A laundryman in India and Pakistan; a washerman
- Droog: A fortified hill or rock.
- Dubash: See Banyan.
- Durbar: The court, the hall of audience; a levee.

== F ==
- Faqueer, Fakir: A poor man, mendicant, a religious beggar.
- Firmaun, Phirmaund: Order, mandate. An imperial decree, a royal grant, or charter.
- Foujdar, Fojedar, Phousdar, Fogedar: Under the Mogul government, a magistrate of the police over a large district, who took cognizance of all criminal matters within his jurisdiction, and sometimes was employed as receiver-general of the revenues.
- Foujdarry, Fojedaree: Office of a Foujdar.
- Foujdarry Court: A court for administering the criminal law.

== G ==
- Ghaut: A pass through a mountain; applied also to a range of hills, and the ford of a river.
- Ghee: Clarified butter, in which state they preserve that article for culinary purposes.
- Ghirdawar, Girdwar: An overseer of police, under whom the goyendas, or informers, act.
- Gomastah: A commissioner, factor, agent.
- Gooroo, Guru: Spiritual guide.
- Goyenda: An inferior officer of police; a spy, informer.
- Gunge: A granary, a depot, chiefly of grain for sale. Wholesale markets, held on particular days. Commercial depots.
- Gurry: A name given to a wall flanked with towers.

== H ==
- Haram, Harem: Seraglio, the place where the ladies reside.
- Hindoo, Hindou: Hindus, followers of Hinduism.
- Hircarra, Harcarrah: A guide, a spy, a messenger.
- Howda: The seat of great men fixed on an elephant, not much unlike the body of a sedan in shape.

== J ==
- Jaghire, Jagheer: Literally, the place of taking. An assignment, to an individual, of the government share of the produce of a portion of land. There were two types of jaghires; one, personal, for the use of the grantee; another, in trust, for some public service, most commonly, the maintenance of troops.
- Jamma, Jumma: Total, amount, collection, assembly. The total of a territorial assignment.
- Jammabundy, Jummabundy: A written schedule of the whole of an assessment.
- Jeel, Keel: A shallow lake, pond or morass.
- Jinjal (also janjal or ganjal): A large musket, fixed on a swivel, used in Indian forts, and fired with great precision. Related words or spellings are gingall, gazail / jazail / jazair.
- Jug: See Yug.
- Jungle, Jangle: A wood, or thicket; a country overrun with shrubs, or long grass.

== K ==
- Khalsa: Pure, unmixed. An office of government, in which the business of the revenue department is transacted: the exchequer. Khalsa lands, are lands, the revenue of which is paid into the exchequer.
- Khan, Cawn: A title, similar to that of Lord.
- Khilaut, Kelaut: A robe of honour, with which princes confer dignity.
- Killader, Kelladar: Warder of a castle commander of a fort.
- Kist: Stated payment, instalment of rent.
- Kushoon, Cushogn: A body of military, corresponding nearest to our term brigade; varying from one to six or eight thousand.

== L ==
- Lac, (also spelt ‘Lakh’): In the Indian numbering system a unit of one hundred thousand or 10^{5} in scientific notation, and written as “1,00,000” (rather than “100,000”) in the Indian convention of digit grouping.
- Lascar: Properly a camp-follower, but applied to native sailors and artillery-men.
- Limber: A low two-wheeled carriage, on which the trial of a gun is fixed when travelling: it is released in a moment if wanted to fire, which is called unlimbering; the cattle being yoked to the limber, guns are of course always dragged breech first.

== M ==
- Maal, Mahl, Mehal, Mhal: Places, districts, departments. Places, or sources of revenue, particularly of a territorial nature; lands.
- Maha: Great.
- Mahratta: The Maratha caste.
- Mocurrery: As applied to lands, it means lands let on a fixed lease.
- Mofussil: Separated, particularized; the subordinate divisions of a district, in contradistinction to Saddur, or Sudder, which implies the chief seat of government.
- Mofussil Dewanny Adawlut: Provincial court of civil justice.
- Mogul: The Mughal Empire.
- Mohammedan, Mahomedan, Moslem: Muslims, followers of the religion of Islam.
- Molungee: Manufacturer of salt.
- Moofty, Muftee, Mufti: The Mahomedan law-officer who declares the sentence.
- Monsoon: The rainy season. The periodical winds and rains.
- Moolavy, Mohlavee, Maulvi: A learned and religious man, an interpreter of the Mahomedan law.
- Moonshee, Munshi: Letter-writer, secretary. Europeans give this title to the native who instructs them in the Persian language.
- Mosque, Musjid, Masjid: The Mahomedan place of worship.
- Musnud: The place of sitting; a seat; a throne, or chair of state.
- Mutseddey, Mutaseddee: Iutent upon. Writer, accountant, secretary.

== N ==
- Nabob, Nawab: A Deputy or vicegerent. The governor of a province under the Mogul government.
- Naib: A deputy.
- Naib Nazim: Deputy of the Nazim, or Governor.
- Naig, Naik: A petty military officer.
- Nair: Chief. The Nairs are a peculiar description of Hindus, on the Malabar coast.
- Nazim: Composer, arranger, adjuster. The first officer of a province, and minister of the department of criminal justice.
- Nerbudda: The Narmada River.
- Nizam: Order, arrangement; an arranger.
- Nizam-ul-Mulk: The administrator of the empire.
- Nizamut: Arrangement, government; the office of the Nazim, or Nizam.
- Nizamut Adawlut: The court of criminal justice.
- Nulla. Streamlet, water-course.
- Nuzzer. A vow, an offering; a present made to a superior.

== O ==
- Omrah: A lord, a grandee, under the Mogul government.
- Omra, Oomra, Umra: The yearly Mahommedan pilgrimage to Mecca.

== P ==
- Pagoda: A temple; also the name of a gold coin, in the south of India, valued at eight shillings.
- Palaiyam: Alternate spelling of Pollam.
- Palankeen, Palanquin: A litter in which gentleman in India recline, and are carried on the shoulders of four men.
- Pariar: A term used by Europeans in India to denote the outcasts of the Hindu tribes.
- Pariah: A social outcast. Also a breed of dog.
- Parsee, Parusi: Parsis, adherents of Zoroastrianism, with Persian ancestry.
- Patan, Pathan: A name applied to the Afghaun tribes.
- Peshwa, Peishwa: Guide, leader. The prime minister of the Mahratta government.
- Peon: A lootmon, a foot soldier; an inferior officer or servant employed in the business of the revenue, police, or judicature.
- Pergunnah, Paragana: A small district, consisting of several villages.
- Peshcush: A present, particularly to government, in consideration of an appointment, or as an acknowledgment for any tenure. Tribute, fine, quit-rent, advance on the stipulated revenues.
- Pettah: The suburbs of a fortified town.
- Polligar, Polygar: Head of a village district. Military chieftain in the Peninsula, similar to hill Zemindar in the northern circars.
- Pollam: A district held by a Polligar.
- Potail: The head man of a village. The term corresponds with that of Mocuddim and Mundul in Bengal.
- Pottah: A lease granted to the cultivators on the part of government, either written on paper, or engraved with a style on the leaf of the fan palmira tree
- Pundit: A learned Brahmen.
- Purana, Pooran: Literally ancient: the name given to such Hindu books as treat of creation in general, with the history of their gods and ancient heroes.
- Pyke: A foot messenger. A person employed as a night-watch in a village, and as a runner or messenger on the business of the revenue.

== R ==
- Rajah, Maharaja: King, prince, chieftain, nobleman; a title in ancient times given to chiefs of the second or military Hindu tribe only.
- Rajepoot, Rajput: Literally, son of a king. The name of a warlike race of Hindus.
- Rana: A type of rajah.
- Ranny, Ranee: Queen, princess, wife of a rajah.
- Roy Royan: A Hindu title given to the principal officer of the Khalsa, or chief treasurer of the exchequer.
- Rupee: The name of a silver coin; rated in the Company's accounts, the current (1810) rupee at 2s.; the Bombay rupee at 2s. 3d.
- Ryot: Peasant, subject; tenant of house or land.

== S ==
- Sayer: What moves; variable imposts, distinct from land rent or revenue; consisting of customs, rolls, licences, duties on goods, also taxes on houses, shops, bazars.
- Scinde, Sind: The Sindh region.
- Scindia, Shinde: A family of nobility.
- Sepoy: A native soldier.
- Serai: The same as Choaltry.
- Shaster: The instrument of government or instruction; any book of instruction, particularly containing divine ordinances.
- Shroff, Shrof: A banker, or money-changer.
- Sirdar, Sardar: Chief, captain, head man.
- Soucar: A merchant, or banker; a money-lender.
- Subah: A province such as Bengal. A grand division of a country, which is again divided into circars, chucklas, pergunnahs, and villages.
- Subahdar, Subedar: The holder of the subah, the governor or viceroy.
- Subahdary: The office and jurisdiction of a subahdar.
- Sudder: The breast; the fore-court of a house; the chief seat of government, contradistinguished from Mofussil, or interior of the country; the presidency.
- Sudder Dewanny Adawlut: The chief civil court of justice under the [xxxv] Company's government, held at the presidency.
- Sudder Nizamut Adawlut: The chief criminal court of justice, under the Company's government.
- Shudra, Sudra, Sooder: A Hindu of the fourth, or lowest tribe.
- Sonnud: A prop, or support; a patent, charter, or written authority for holding either land or office.

== T ==
- Talookdar: A holder of a talook, which is a small portion of land; a petty land-agent.
- Tank: Pond, reservoir.
- Tannahdar, Thanadar: A petty police officer.
- Teed: A note of hand; a promissory note given by a native banker, or money-lender, to Zemindars and others, to enable them to furnish government with security for the payment of their rents.
- Tehsildar: Who has charge of the collections. A native collector of a district, acting under a European or Zemindar.
- Topashes: Native black Christians, the remains of the ancient Portuguese.
- Tope: A grove of trees.
- Tuncaw, Tunkha: An assignment on the revenue, for personal support, or other purposes.
- Tumbril: A carriage for the gun ammunition.

== V ==
- Vackbel, Vaqnibl: One endowed with authority to act for another. Ambassador, agent sent on a special commission, or residing at a court. Native law pleader, under the judicial system of the Company.
- Vizir, Vizier: Under the Mogul government, the prime minister of the sovereign.
- Vedas, Veds, Beeds: Science, knowledge. The sacred scriptures of the Hindus.

== W ==
- Wallah: A servant or other person responsible for something, often specified before it, for example kitchen wallah

== Y ==
- Yogies, Jogies: Hindu devotees.
- Yug, Jug, Yoog: An age; a great period of the Hindus; also a religious ceremony.

== Z ==
- Zemindar: From two words signifying, earth, land, and holder or keeper. Land-keeper. An officer who, under the Mahomedan government, was charged with the superintendence of the lands of a district, financially considered; the protection of the cultivators, and the realization of the government's share of its produce, either in money or kind.
- Zemindarry: The office or jurisdiction of a Zemindar.
- Zenana: The place where the ladies reside.
- Zillah, Zila, Jilla: Side, part, district, division. A local division of a country having reference to personal jurisdiction.

== See also ==
- Colonial British India
