= List of famines =

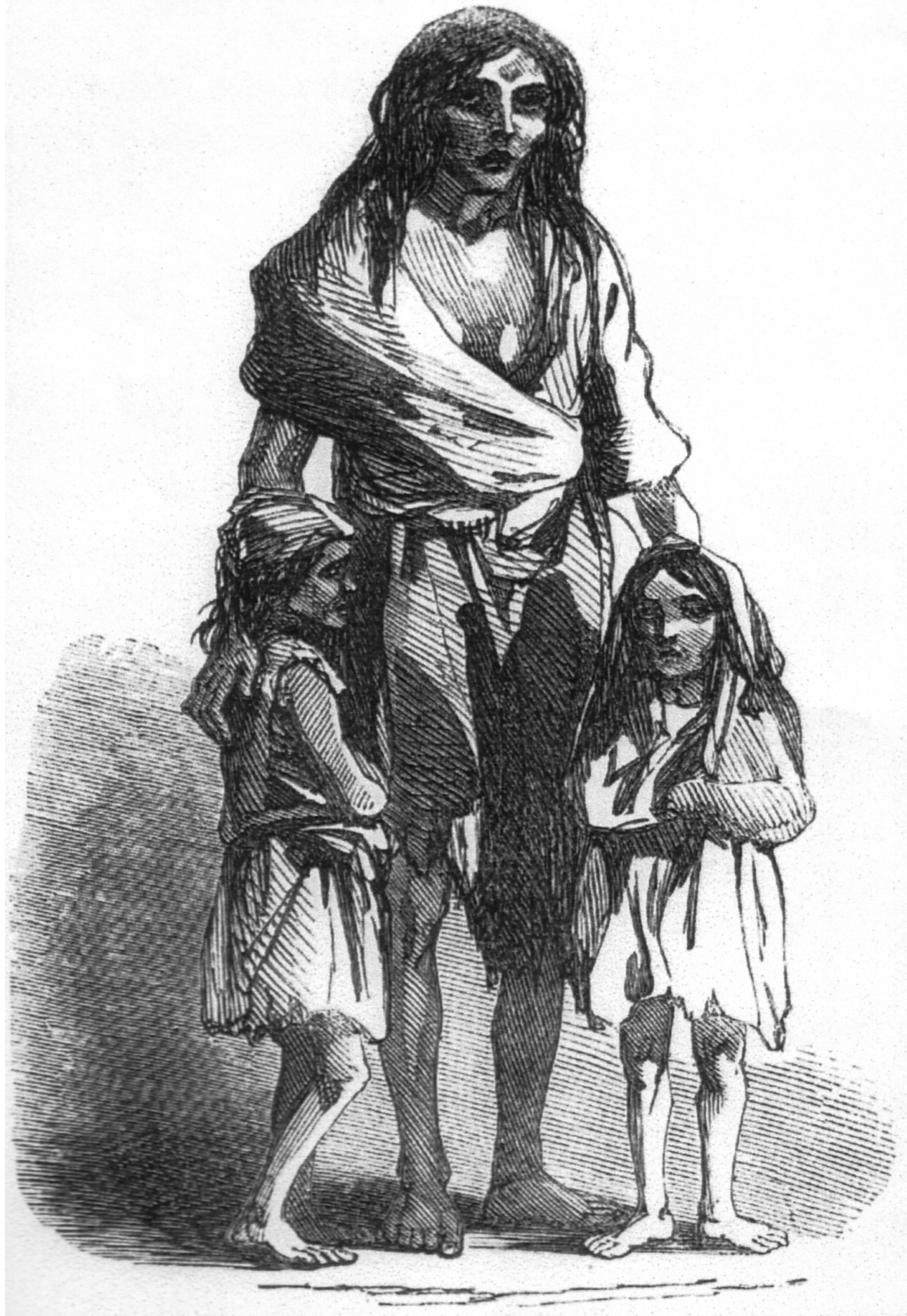
Depiction of victims of the Irish Great Famine, 1845–1852.

== Scatter plot ==
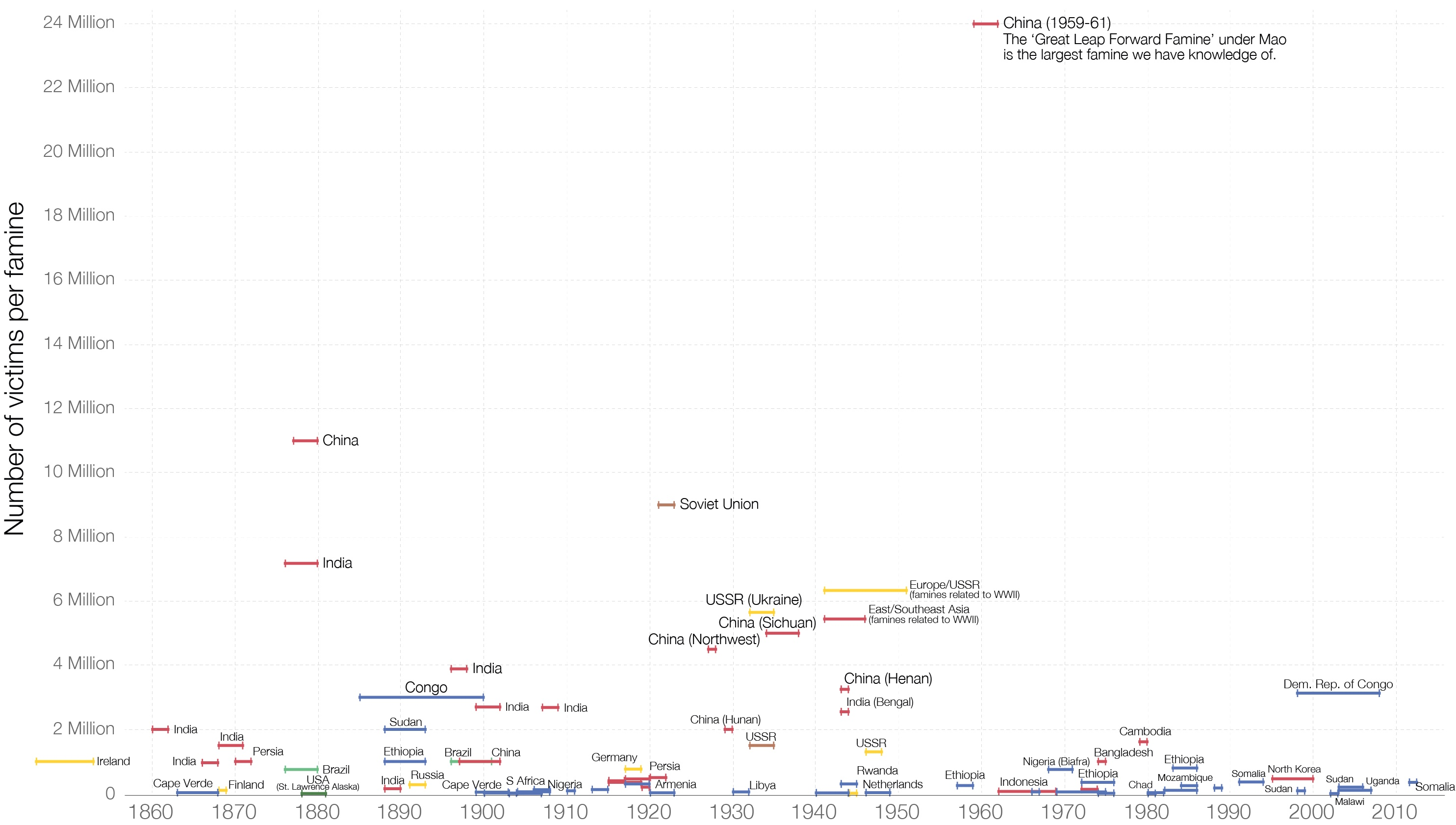

== List ==
Date	Event	Location	Death toll (where known; estimated)
c. 2,700 BC	Seven year famine, recorded on the Famine Stela	Egypt	
2200 BC–2100 BC	The 4.2-kiloyear event caused famines and civilizational collapse worldwide	Global	
441 BC	The first famine recorded in ancient Rome.	Ancient Rome	
114 BC	Famine caused by drought during the third year in the Yuanding period. Starvation in over 40 commanderies east of the Hangu mountain pass.	Han China	
103 BC–89 BC	Beminitiya Seya during the reign of the Five Dravidians	Anuradhapura kingdom	
c. 43 BC	Famine due to volcanic winter following the eruption of Mount Etna in 44 BC and the larger eruption of Mount Okmok early in 43 BC, affecting China (43 BC), Italy (43 BC), Egypt (c. 43 BC – c. 42 BC) and Greece (42 BC).	Roman Republic, Egypt and China	
26 BC	Famine recorded throughout Near East and Levant, as recorded by Josephus	Judea	20,000+
333 AD	Famine in Antioch	Coele Syria, Roman Empire	
368–369	Famine during the drought of the 360s–370s	Cappadocia, Byzantine Empire	
370	Famine in Phrygia	Phrygia	
372–373	Famine in Edessa	Edessa	
375–376	Famine during the drought of the 360s–370s	Byzantine Empire	
383	Famine in Rome. A policy had been introduced in 364 AD that stipulated taxes in Rome had to be paid in grain	Italian Peninsula	
400–800	Various famines in Western Europe associated with the Fall of the Western Roman Empire and its sack by Alaric I. Between 400 and 800 AD, the population of the city of Rome fell by over 80%, mainly because of famine and plague.	Western Europe	
470	Famine	Gaul	
535–536	Volcanic winter of 536	Global	
544	Famine in Myra	Byzantine Empire	
585	Famine	Gaul	
618–619	Famine in Constantinople	Byzantine Empire	
639	Famine in Arabia during the reign of Umar	Arabia	
676–678	Famine	Thessalonica, Byzantine Empire	
698–700	Famine	Ireland	
750s	Famine	Islamic Spain (Al-Andalus)	
762–764	Famine associated with hard winters and drought	Carolingian Europe, the Balkans, the Byzantine Empire and possibly north of the Black Sea	
779	Famine	Northern Carolingian Europe and possibly Ireland	
791–794	Famine, possibly associated with heavy rain, affecting England in 793	Carolingian Europe and England	
800–1000	Severe drought killed millions of Maya people due to famine and thirst and initiated a cascade of internal collapses that destroyed their civilization.	Mayan areas of Mesoamerica	1,000,000+
805–807	Famine associated with a hard winter and drought	Northern Carolingian Empire	
820–824	Famine associated with heavy rain, hard winters, drought, hail and possibly cattle pestilence	Carolingian Empire, possibly Ireland, England and the Byzantine Empire	
841–845	Famine associated with heavy rain and hard winters	Northern (and possibly southern) Carolingian Empire, the Byzantine Empire and the Middle East	
867–869	Famine associated with heavy rain, flooding and possibly cattle pestilence	Northern Carolingian Empire	
872–874	Famine associated with heavy rain, hail, locusts, a hard winter, drought and Saharan sand	Carolingian Empire	
875–884	Peasant rebellion in China inspired by famine; Huang Chao captured capital	China	
895–897	Famine associated with hail and a hard winter	Northern Carolingian Europe, England and Ireland	
927–928	Famine caused by four months of frost	Byzantine Empire	
939–944	Famine associated with hard winters, heavy rain, flooding, Saharan sand, locusts and possibly cattle pestilence	Northern (and possibly southern) Carolingian Europe, Ireland and the Middle East	
942–944	Famine in the Yellow River Basin caused by severe drought and locust plagues. During the first month 5387 families fled, then approximately 10% of the remaining population starved to death.	China	
963–968	Famine	Egypt	
975–976	Famine	England	
975–976	Famine	Iceland	
996–997	Famine in the Fatimid Caliphate, with food price increases	Egypt	
1004–1007	Famine, resulting in food scarcity, price increases and widespread illnesses. Caliph al-Ḥākim punished merchants who raised prices too high with the death penalty, and prohibited the slaughter of healthy cows which could be used for ploughing	Maghreb area in Northwest Africa: Algeria, Libya, Mauritania, Morocco, Tunisia and Egypt	
1005–1006	Famine, including in England	Europe	
1010	Famine in Nīshābūr	Ghaznavid Empire	
1016	Famine throughout Europe	Europe	
1021	Famine	Norway	
1025	Famine	Egypt	
1031	Famine caused by a sandstorm that destroyed crops, trees and provisions	Arabian Peninsula; Modern day Iraq and Saudi Arabia	
c. 1045	Famine	England	
1051	Famine forced the Toltecs to migrate from a stricken region in what is now central Mexico	Mexico (present day)	
1055–1056	Famine	Egypt	
1057–1058	Famine	Iceland	
1064–1072	Mustansirite Hardship	Egypt	40,000
1069–1070	Harrying of the North	England	100,000
1087	Famine	England	
1097	Famine and plague	France	100,000
1099–1101	Probable famine	Denmark	
1111	Famine	England	
1118	Famine	Iceland	
1124–1126	Famine in England, the Low Countries and northern France	Europe	
1143–1147	Famine	Europe	
1150–1151	Famine	Europe	
1150–1151	Widespread famine due to wet/cold	Japan	
1153	Local famine of unknown cause	Japan	
1155	Widespread famine of unknown cause	Japan	
1161	Widespread famine of unknown cause	Japan	
1161–1162	Famine	Aquitaine	
1174–1175	Local famine due to wet/cold	Feudal Japan	
1180–1182	Yōwa famine	Japan	42,300 in Kyoto
1182	Famine	Norway	
1183	Local famine of unknown cause	Japan	
1185	Widespread famine due to drought	Japan	
1193–1198	Famine	England	
1196–1197	Famine	Europe	
1196–1198	Probable famine	Denmark	
1199–1202	Famine due to the low water level of the Nile impacting food prices	Egypt	100,000
1201	Local famine due to wet/cold	Japan	
1206	Widespread famine of unknown cause	Japan	
1207–1213	Famine(s), e.g. in 1207 and 1211–1213	Norway	
1224–1226	Famine	Europe	
1225–1226	Probable famine	Denmark	
1229–1232	The Kanki famine, possibly the worst famine in Japan's history. Caused by volcanic eruptions.	Japan	2,000,000
1230	Famine in the Novgorod Republic	Novgorod Republic	
1233	Local famine due to wet/cold	Japan	
1235	Famine	England	20,000 in London
1252	Famine	Ethiopia	
1252	Widespread famine due to wet/cold	Japan	
1255–1262	Famine in Spain and Portugal	Iberian Peninsula	
1256	Famine in Tuscany	Tuscany	
1256–1258	Famine	Low Countries	
1256–1258	Famine	Italy	
1257–1260	Shōga famine, aggravated by the 1257 Samalas eruption	Japan	
1258–1259	Famine in England, Italy, France, the Holy Roman Empire and the Iberian Peninsula, aggravated by the 1257 Samalas eruption	Western Europe	
1263	Famine	Ireland	
1264	Famine in 662 AH (1263/1264 CE). The crisis started in February 1264, following a low flooding of the Nile.	Egypt	
1270–1271	Famine	Ireland	
1271	Widespread famine due to drought	Japan	
1271–1272	Famine	Italy	
1273–1274	Widespread famine due to drought	Japan	
1275–1277	Famine	Italy	
1275–1299	Collapse of the Anasazi civilization, widespread famine occurred	United States	
1279	Famine	Russia/Ukraine	
1281–1282	Famine	Central Europe	
1282	Famine	Russia/Ukraine	
1283	Apparent severe famine	Denmark	
1285–1286	Famine. (Perhaps 1286 only.)	Italy	
1291	Famine caused by years of drought and recorded in one chronicle	Sweden	
1294–1296	Famine caused by sandstorm that covered plantations and destroyed crops.	Egypt, Syria, Yemen	
1294–1296	Famine lasting 1294–1296 in Ireland and 1295–1296 in Great Britain	British Isles	
1300	Famine due to the eruption of Hekla	Iceland	
1301–1302	Famine	Spain	
1302–1303	Famine	Italy	
1304	Famine	France	
1305	Famine	France	
1308–1310	Famine	Russia/Ukraine	
1310	Famine	France	
1310	Probable famine and apparent drought	Denmark	
1311	Famine	Spain	
1311–1312	Famine	Lombardy, Italy	
1313	Famine	Pistoia, Tuscany, Italy	
1314–1315	Famine. Dikes collapsed, fields vanished, crops rotted, and livestock died in huge numbers due to the disease "Rinderpest". The price of wheat jumped "8 fold".	England	
1315–1317 or 1322	Great Famine of 1315–1317. Famine lasted from 1313–1317 in Spain and 1314–1316 in Russia/Ukraine. Elsewhere, famine began in 1315 and ended in either 1317 (Great Britain, France, the Low Countries, Denmark and Sweden) or 1318 (Central Europe and Ireland).	Europe	7,500,000
1319–1320	Great Bovine Pestilence	England	
1321	Famine	England	
1322–1325	Famine	Sardinia	
1326–1330	Famine in Italy (possibly beginning in 1328), Spain and Ireland	Europe	
1330–1331	Famine with humid, rainy and stormy weather	Ireland	
1330–1332	Famine	Russia/Ukraine	
1330–1333	Famine	France	
1333–1336	Famine (see Lo mal any primer)	Spain	
1333–1337	Chinese famine of 1333–1337	China	6,000,000
1338–1339	Famine (possibly just 1339)	Ireland	
1339–1341	Famine in Italy (possibly ending in 1340), Spain and Ireland	Europe	
1344–1345	Famine in India, under the reign of Muhammad bin Tughluq	India	
1346	Famine	Ireland	
1346–1348	Following a likely tropical volcanic eruption (or series of eruptions) c. 1345 and cool weather (plus heavy autumn rain in Italy) lasting 1345–1347, there was a widespread European famine, particularly in the south, including Italy (1346–1347), Spain (1346–1348) and southern France (1347). Dearth or famine also affected Egypt and the Levant, and cereals peaked in price in the Hejaz. Grain imports from the Black Sea region may have introduced the Black Death to Italy in 1347.	Europe and the Mamluk Sultanate	
1349–1351	Famine affecting England (1351) and coinciding with the Black Death	Great Britain	
1349–1351	Famine	France	
1352–1353	Famine	Italy	
1358–1360	Famine	France	
1361–1362	Famine	Russia/Ukraine	
1364–1366	Famine	Russia/Ukraine	
1368	Famine	Italy	
1369	Famine	England	
1369–1370	Famine	Florence, Tuscany, Italy	
1370	Famine caused by harvest failure in 1369	Norway	
1371	Famine	Russia/Ukraine	
1371	Famine	France	
1374	Famine	Russia/Ukraine	
1374–1375	Near pan-Mediterranean famine in France, Spain and Italy	Europe	
1374–1375	Famine	Egypt	
1384–1385	Famine	Italy	
1389	Famine	Pistoia, Tuscany, Italy	
1390–1391	Famine	France	
1393	Famine	Pistoia, Tuscany, Italy	
1394–1396	Famine	Egypt	
1397	Famine, with a windy, wet and cold summer and autumn	Ireland	
1396–1407	The Durga Devi famine	India	
1402–1404	Famine	Ottoman Empire	
1403–1404	Famine	Egypt	
1409	Famine	Russia/Ukraine	
1410	Great famine	Ireland	
1410–1412	Famine	Italy	
1420–1421	Oei famine (due to drought)	Japan	
1420–1421	Famine	France	
1420–1423	Famine	Russia/Ukraine	
1426	Great Famine in Majapahit Empire	Majapahit Empire	
1429–1432	Famine	France	
1431	Famine	Russia/Ukraine	
1432–1434	The Hungry Years	Czech Republic	
1434–1437	Famine	Nordic countries	
1435	Famine	Spain	
1436–1440	Famine in Russia/Ukraine (1436–1438), the Low Countries and Great Britain (1437–1438), France (1437–1439) and Germany and Switzerland (1437–1440)	Europe	
1441	Famine in Mayapan	Mexico	
1442–1445	Famine	Russia/Ukraine	
1446	Famine	Nordic countries	
1447	Famine (or hunger)	Ireland	
1447–1448	Famine	Sweden	
1450–1454	Famine in the Aztec Empire, interpreted as the gods' need for sacrifices.	Mexico	
1458	Famine	Italy	
1459–1461	Kanshō famine (due to drought)	Japan	82,000
1460	The Deccan region faced significant famine, leading to severe food shortages.	India	
1468	Famine	Russia/Ukraine	
1470	Famine	France	
1470	Famine	Nordic countries	
1472	Famine	Russia/Ukraine	
1472	Famine in central Honshu due to drought	Japan	
1472–1474	Famine	Italy	
1475–1477	Famine	Spain	
1476	Famine	Italy	
1477	Famine in central Honshu	Japan	
1481–1484	Famine(s) in the Low Countries (1481–1482), France (1481–1483), the East of England (1481–1483) and Italy (1482–1484)	Western Europe	
1485	Famine	Russia/Ukraine	
1491–1492	Famine	Low Countries	
1491–1492	Famine	Kai Province, Japan	
1492	Famine	Ireland	
1493	Famine	Italy	
1497–1498	Great famine (possibly just 1497)	Ireland	
1502–1505	Famine	Italy	
1503	Famine	Nordic countries	
1504	Famine during a drought	Spain	
1506–1508	Famine	Spain	
1512	Famine	Russia/Ukraine	
1513	Famine during a drought	Murcia, Spain	
1515	Famine	France	
1515–1516	Famine	Russia/Ukraine	
1516–1518	Famine	Germany and Switzerland	
1518–1520	Famine	Italy	
1520–1523	Famine	Nordic countries	
1521–1522	Famine(s)	France and the Low Countries	
1521–1522	Famine during a drought	Andalusia, Spain	
1523	Great famine	Ireland	
1525	Famine	Russia/Ukraine	
1527–1532	Famine(s) in Italy (1527–1529), France (1527–1532, including Languedoc by 1528), Spain (1528–1530) and Austria and Switzerland (1530–1531)	Europe	
1533–1534	Famine	Italy	
1535	Famine in Ethiopia	Ethiopia	
1539–1540	Famine	Italy	
1539–1540	Tenbun famine (due to rain)	Japan	
1540	Famine during a drought	Spain	
1544–1545	Famine	Italy	
1545	Famine	France	
1550–1551	Famine in isolated areas of central Honshu due to an earthquake and typhoon	Japan	
1550–1552	Famine	Italy	
1556	Famine	Ireland	
1556–1557	Famine	Low Countries	
1556–1557	Famine (perhaps affecting Denmark but not Sweden, and perhaps only in 1556)	Nordic countries	
1557	Famine in the Volga region and northern Russia	Russia	
1557	Famine throughout Spain due to a rainy winter, coinciding with a typhus outbreak	Spain	
1557–1558	Famine in Honshu	Japan	
1557–1559	Famine coinciding with an influenza outbreak	Great Britain	
1558–1560	Famine	Italy	
1560–1561	Famine	Russia/Ukraine	
1562	Famine following a harsh winter in 1561	France	
1565–1566	Famine	Central Europe	
1566–1567	Famine during a drought	Andalusia, Spain	
1567–1570	Famine in Harar, combined with plague. The Emir of Harar died.	Ethiopia	
1568–1574	Pan-European famine or famines affecting Russia and mostly east of Ukraine (1568–1572), Italy (1569–1572), Germany, Austria and Switzerland (1569–1574), the Nordic countries (1571–1572), the Low Countries (1572–1573) and France (1573–1574). Germany/Austria/Switzerland saw crop failures, plague and witch hunts in one of their most severe famines.	Europe	
1573	Famine due to drought	Western Japan	
1585–1589	Pan-European famine or famines, affecting Great Britain, France and the Low Countries (1585–1587), Italy (1586–1587) and Ireland (1586–1589). In Ireland, this famine followed the Second Desmond Rebellion.	Western Europe	
1586	Famine and drought. Rice prices skyrocketed and there was widespread population migration and starvation.	Qishan County, Shaanxi province, China	
1588	Famine	Wei County, Hebei province, China	
1589	Famine	Russia/Ukraine	
1590–1598	Major European famine, including Italy (1590–1593), the Nordic countries (Denmark, Sweden, Finland and Norway, 1590–1597), Russia/Ukraine (1591), Spain (1591–1595), France (1593 & 1598), Great Britain (either 1594–1598 or 1597–1599), Germany and Austria (1594–1598). The degree to which this should be considered one widespread famine as opposed to many regional ones is unclear: it mainly affected southern Europe in 1590–1593, then central and northern Europe in 1594–1598. The famine may also be associated with a critical phase of the Little Ice Age. It caused the large-scale restructuring of European grain trade routes, which contributed to the Low Countries' avoiding this famine.	Europe	
1592–1594	Famine during the Japanese invasions of Korea (1592–1598), known in Korea as the Kyegap Famine (Korean: 계갑대기근; Hanja: 癸甲大飢饉).	Joseon	
1593–1600	Famine	Portugal	
1596	Famine	India	
1599–1600	Famine	Spain	
1600–1601	Famine in Emilia and southern Lombardy	Italy	
1600–1603	Famine linked to the Nine Years' War	Ireland	
1601–1602	Cooling, famine and epidemics following the eruption of Huaynaputina in 1600	Guizhou and Shanxi provinces, China	
1601–1603	One of the worst famines in all of Russian history, with as many as 100,000 in Moscow and up to one-third of the country's population killed; see Russian famine of 1601–1603. The same famine killed about half of the Estonian population.	Russia	2,000,000
1601–1603	Famine in 1601 in Finland and in 1602–1603 in Denmark, Sweden, Finland and Norway, following the eruption of Huaynaputina in 1600	Nordic countries	
1602	Famine	Central Europe	
1602	Famine	Great Britain	
1605–1607	Famine	Spain	
1607–1608	Famine	Italy	
1608	Famine	Russia/Ukraine	
1615–1616	Famine	Spain	
1616–1623	Famine	Portugal	
1618–1622	Famine	Italy	
1618–1648	Famines in Europe caused by the Thirty Years' War, including in 1620–1623 in Germany (often attributed to Kipper und Wipper, violent conflict, the closing of borders and trade routes, and requisitioning by armies), possibly in 1628–1630 in Jutland and in 1635–1636 in Germany, Austria and Switzerland. In the 1630s, famine in these countries was frequent but more local, often resulting from occupation or sieges.	Europe	
1619	Famine in Japan. During the Edo period, there were 154 famines, of which 21 were widespread and serious.	Japan	
1621–1624	Famine	Nordic countries	
1622–1624	Famine (possibly 1623–1625 in Great Britain) in North West England, Ireland, north-west Wales (1622–1623) and Scotland (where it hit in 1623, following harvest failures in the autumns of 1621–1622), due to wet and cold weather.	British Isles	
1623	Famine	Russia/Ukraine	
1625–1626	Famine	Low Countries	
1625–1630	Famine(s) involving plague and witch hunts, due to exceptionally bad harvests	Austria and Germany	
1626–1627	Pyŏngjŏng Famine (Korean: 병정대기근; Hanja: 丙丁大飢饉)	Joseon	
1628–1630	Famine or apparent famine in Sweden (1630), with people eating bark in the south of Sweden	Nordic countries	
1628–1632	Famine	Italy	
1629–1631	Famine. According to the prevailing literature, this was England's last famine.	Great Britain	
1630–1631	Famine in Northwest China	China	
1630–1631	Famine	Spain	
1630–1632	Deccan famine of 1630–1632	India	7,400,000
1630–1632	Famine	Portugal	
1631–1632	Famine (possibly 1630–1631)	France	
1633–1634	Famine in Norway, Sweden, Finland and Sweden's Baltic possessions	Swedish Empire and Norway	
1636	Famine	Russia/Ukraine	
1640–1643	Kan'ei Great Famine	Japan	50,000–100,000
1641–1643	Famine	Nordic countries	
1641–1652	A succession of famines related to the Irish Confederate Wars. Deaths were concentrated in the more sparsely populated Ulster and north-east Connacht in the 1640s; afterwards, the south was worst affected and plague exacerbated the famine.	Ireland	
1647–1649	Famine including in northern England (1649)	Great Britain	
1647–1652	Famine in Spain and Portugal	Iberian Peninsula	
1648–1649	Famine	Italy	
1648–1651	Famine	Low Countries	
1648–1652	Famine in the east (1650–1652), possibly 1649–1652.	France	
1648–1660	The Deluge saw Poland lose an estimated 1/3 of its population due to wars, famine, and plague	Poland	
1650–1652	Famine	Russia/Ukraine	
1650–1652	Famine due to severe crop failures in 1650 and 1651. Grain exports were banned and grain was imported from the Baltic states. The crude death rate was over twice the normal value in the east in 1650, and in the north, middle and east in 1651–1652.	Sweden	
1651–1652	Famine due to exceptionally bad harvests	Germany	
1651–1653	Famine throughout much of Ireland during the Cromwellian conquest of Ireland. The more densely populated south was worst affected, and plague exacerbated the famine.	Ireland	
1657–1663	Famine	Portugal	
1659–1662	Famine(s) in Italy and Spain (1659–1662), and in France, Central Europe and the Low Countries (1661–1662)	Europe	
1661	Famine in India, due to lack of any rainfall for two years	India	
1670–1671	Kyungshin Famine	Joseon	1,000,000–1,500,000
1672	Famine in southern Italy	Italy	
1674	Famine	Russia/Ukraine	
1674–1676	Famine	Low Countries	
1674–1677	Famine	Nordic countries	
1675–1677	Famine affecting northern and central Sweden (1675), inland and coastal Norway (1676) and Denmark (1676–1677)	Scandinavia	
1675–1678	Famine	Portugal	
1676	Famine	France	
1677	Famine	Russia/Ukraine	
1678–1679	Famine	Italy	
1678–1685	Famines and plague	Spain	
1680	Famine in Sardinia	Italy (present day)	80,000
1680–1682	Enpo-Tenna famine (due to rain)	Japan	
1680s	Famine in Sahel	West Africa	
1690s	Seven Ill Years – a famine which killed 5–15% of the population (possibly 1697–1699)	Scotland	60,000–180,000
1691–1695	Particularly severe famine due to severe rain and cold, which reduced harvests	Germany, Austria and Switzerland	
1692–1694	Famine	Low Countries	
1693–1694	Great Famine of 1693–1694	France	700,000–1,300,000
1693–1697	Major European famine affecting Germany, Austria and Switzerland (1691–1695), the Low Countries (1692–1694), France (Great Famine of 1693–1694), Italy (1693–1695), where it was second only to the 1590s famine, Portugal (1693–1697), Spain (1694–1699), Finland and Estonia (Great Famine of 1695–1697), Russia/Ukraine (1695–1697), Norway (1696) and Sweden (1696–1698) and Great Britain (Seven Ill Years, 1697–1699)	Europe	
1694–1699	Famine	Spain	
1695–1696	First Genroku famine (due to rain)	Japan	
1695–1697	Great Famine of Estonia, which killed about a fifth of the population.	Swedish Estonia and Swedish Livonia	70,000–100,000
1695–1698	Great Famine of 1695–1697, including the Great Famine of Estonia. Famine also hit Norway (1696) and Sweden (1696–1698, 80,000–100,000 dead)	Swedish Empire and Norway	150,000 in Finland
1696	Famine in Aleppo	Ottoman Empire	
1696–1699	Ŭlbyŏng famine	Joseon	1,410,000 per official Annals, but possibly higher.
1698–1699	Famine	Low Countries	
1698–1701	Famine due to severe rain and cold, which reduced harvests	Germany, Austria and Switzerland	
1700	Famine, with mortality around 35% above the normal rate	Denmark	
1701–1703	Second Genroku famine (due to rain)	Japan	
1702–1704	Famine in Deccan	India	2,000,000
1706–1711	Famine	Spain	
1708–1711	Famine in Spain (1706–1711), the Low Countries (1708–1710), Italy (1709 or 1708–1709), France (1709–1710), probably Sweden and Finland (1709–1710, coinciding with the Great Northern War and the Great Northern War plague outbreak), Denmark (1710) and Germany and Austria (1709–1712).	Europe	
1708–1711	Famine and disease in East Prussia killed 250,000 people or 41% of its population. According to other sources the great mortality was due to plague (disease), which between 1709 and 1711 killed about 200,000–250,000 out of 600,000 inhabitants of East Prussia. The Great Northern War plague outbreak of 1708–1712 also affected East Prussia.	East Prussia	250,000
1709–1710	The Great Famine of 1709	France	600,000
1709–1712	Famine following the Großer Winter (Great Winter) of 1708–1709, coinciding with the Great Palatine Migration of 1709	Germany and Austria	
1714–1715	Famine	Central Europe	
1716	Famine	Italy	
1717	Famine in the north and west	Sweden	
1718–1719	Famine	France	
1719	High mortality probably connected to famine	Denmark	
1719–1721	Famine	Central Europe	
1721–1724	Famine	Russia/Ukraine	
1722	Famine	Arabia	
1724	Famine	Italy	
1724–1725	Famine	Germany	
1727–1728	Perhaps England's last famine. Limited to a few parishes, there were food riots and increased mortality, but contemporaries did not consider this a famine, and the prevailing literature considers the 1629–1631 famine England's last.	The Midlands, England	
1728–1730	High mortality probably connected to famine	Denmark	
1730	Famine	Silesia	
1730s	Famine in Damascus	Ottoman Empire	
1732–1733	Kyōhō famine	Japan	12,172–169,000
1738–1756	Famine in West Africa, half the population of Timbuktu died of starvation	West Africa	
1739–1740	Famine associated with extremely cold winter(s) (Große Kälte)	Germany and Austria	
1740–1741	Irish Famine (1740–1741)	Ireland	300,000–480,000
1740–1743	Famine in central Sweden (1740), eastern Norway (1742), northern and central Sweden (1743) and probably Denmark (1740–1742)	Scandinavia	
1750–1756	Famine in the Senegambia region	Senegal, Gambia (present day)	
1755–1757	Horeki famine (due to rain)	Japan	
1755–1758	Famine coinciding with crop failures and the Seven Years' War	Germany	
1756–1757	Partial famine and influenza epidemic. There was a modest public relief effort and a temporary embargo on distilling.	Ireland	
1757	Famine	Syria	
1758	Regional famine following crop failures in 1756–1757, with high mortality also affecting other counties	Kopparberg County, Sweden	
1763	Regional famine, with high mortality also affecting other counties	Gothenburg and Bohus County, Sweden	
1763–1764	High mortality probably connected to famine and coinciding with an influenza pandemic	Denmark	
1764	Famine in Italy (including the Kingdom of Naples) during a period of drought	Italy	
1765	Famine	Norway	
1766	Smaller famine	Ireland	
1767	Famine during a period of drought	Italy	
1769–1773	Great Bengal famine of 1770, 10 million dead (one third of population)	India, Bangladesh (present day)	10,000,000
1770–1772	Severe famine in German-speaking lands and most neighbouring countries, due to a series of harvest failures. Heavy rain had affected an area stretching from France to Poland and from Scandinavia to Switzerland, impeding the storage and transportation of grain. Epidemic disease resulted from malnutrition and migration. In the Ore Mountains and Bohemia, around 200,000 people (10% of the population) either died or fled. The famine provoked migration, plus changes in education, economics, welfare and medicine. See also: Famines in Czech lands.	Germany, Austria, Switzerland and Bohemia	60,000 in Saxony
1771–1773	Famine in Norway (1771–1773), central Sweden (1772–1773) and Finland. Norway saw a mortality crisis during 1771–1773, and famine in the east in 1773. In Sweden, mortailty peaked in 1773, with about half of excess mortality due to dysentery.	Nordic countries	
1776	Famine following a series of hurricanes that struck the island	Martinique	
1779	Famine in Rabat	Morocco	
1782	Famine in Karahisar	Ottoman Empire	
1782–1784	Famine leading to an embargo on food exports from June 1783–January 1784	Ireland	
1782–1788	Great Tenmei famine	Japan	20,000–920,000
1783–1784	Chalisa famine	India	11,000,000
1783–1785	Famine in Iceland caused by the eruption of Laki killed around one-fifth or 26% of Iceland's population and 80% of livestock. Restrictions on fishing prevented most Icelanders from adopting fishing as an alternative to farming.	Iceland	
1784	Widespread famine throughout Egypt, one-sixth of the population died	Egypt	
1784–1785	Famine in Tunisia	Tunisia	
c. 1785	Famine	Norway	
1786–1787	The last famine in Denmark, following bad harvests in 1785–1786. Due to grain imports, Copenhagen was less affected than the rest of Denmark.	Denmark	
1788	The two years previous to the French Revolution saw bad harvests and harsh winters, possibly because of a strong El Niño cycle or caused by the 1783 Laki eruption in Iceland.	France	
1789	Famine in Ethiopia afflicted the Amhara and Tigray Regions	Ethiopia	
1789–1793	Doji bara famine or Skull famine	India	11,000,000
1796	Famine caused by locusts	Northern Ethiopia	
1799–1800	Famine in Diyarbakır	Ottoman Empire	
1799–1801	Famine and disease. Emergency rice and maize imports were bought from the United States.	Ireland	40,000
1800	Regional famine	Jämtland County, Sweden	
1801	Famine (during a food crisis in Milan lasting 1799–1801)	Italy	
1801	Regional famine	Västerbotten County, Sweden	
1804–1872, 1913	A series of 14 famines in Austrian Galicia	Poland, Ukraine (present day)	400,000–550,000
1808	Regional famine	Skaraborg County, Sweden	
1809	Regional famines	Jämtland and Västerbotten counties, Sweden	
1809–1815	Crop failure due to dry weather conditions.	Joseon (Korea)	2,000,000
1811–1812	Famine devastated Madrid	Spain	20,000
1812	Regional famine	Östergötland County, Sweden	
1816–1817	Year Without a Summer	Worldwide	1,000,000+
1822	Famine	Western Ireland	
1831	Famine	Ireland	
1830–1833	Famine, claimed to have killed 42% of the population	Cape Verde	30,000
1832–1833	Guntur famine of 1832	Madras Presidency, India	150,000
1832–1833	Famine	Finland	
1833–1837	Tenpō famine	Japan	
1837–1838	Agra famine of 1837–1838	India	800,000
1845–1857	Highland Potato Famine	Scotland	150,000 estimated
1845–1852	Great Famine	Ireland	1,000,000 estimated deaths 1,500,000 to 2,000,000 that emigrated
1846	Famine led to the peasant revolt known as "Maria da Fonte" in the north of Portugal	Portugal	
1846–1848	The Newfoundland Potato Famine, related to the Great Famine of Ireland	Newfoundland, present-day Canada	
1849–1850	Demak and Grobogan in central Java, caused by four successive crop failures due to drought.	Indonesia	83,000
1857–1858	Famine	Finland	
1860–1861	Black Winter of 1860–1861	Qajar Iran	
1860–1861	Upper Doab famine of 1860–1861	India	2,000,000
1863–1867	Famine in Cape Verde	Cape Verde	30,000
1866	Orissa famine of 1866	India	1,000,000
1866	Keio famine (due to rain)	Japan	
1866–1868	Finnish famine of 1866–1868. About 15% of the entire population died	Finland	150,000+
1866–1868	Famine in French Algeria	French Algeria	820,000
1867–1869	Swedish famine of 1867–1869	Northern Sweden	
1869	Rajputana famine of 1869	India	1,500,000
1869–1870	Famines due to weather, with North Hamgyong Province particularly affected.	Joseon	
1870–1872	Persian famine of 1870–1872, extended by some scholars from 1869 to 1873	Qajar Iran	200,000–3,000,000 Estimates vary
1873–1874	Famine in Anatolia caused by drought and floods	Turkey (present day)	
1873–1874	Bihar famine of 1873–1874	India	
1876–1878	Great Indian Famine of 1876–1878	India	5,500,000
1876–1879	Northern Chinese Famine of 1876–1879	China	9,000,000–13,000,000
1876–1878	Brazilian drought of 1877–1878, also known as the Grande Seca	Brazil	500,000
1878–1880	St. Lawrence Island famine, Alaska	United States	1,000
1879	1879 Famine in Ireland. Unlike previous famines, this famine mainly caused hunger and food shortages but little mortality.	Ireland	
1879	Famine in the Eastern areas of the Empire	Ottoman Empire	
1883–1884	Famine in Indramayu and Kandanghaur	Indonesia	
1883–1885	Famine caused by failure of rainy seasons and drought.	East Africa,Tanzania and Kenya	
1888–1889	Famine in Orrisa, Ganjam and Northern Bihar	India	150,000
1888–1892	Famine in Sudan during the Mahdist war	Sudan	1,500,000
1888–1892	Ethiopian Great famine. About one-third of the population died. Conditions worsen with cholera outbreaks (1889–92), a typhus epidemic, and a major smallpox epidemic (1889–90).	Ethiopia	1,000,000
1891–1892	Russian famine of 1891–1892. Beginning along the Volga River and spreading to the Urals and the Black Sea.	Russia	375,000–500,000
1895–1898	Famine during the Cuban War of Independence	Cuba	200,000–300,000
1896–1902	Indian famine of 1896–1897 and Indian famine of 1899–1900 due to drought and British policies.	India	2,000,000 (British territories), mortality unknown in princely states
1897–1901	Famine in East Africa, caused by drought and locust swarms. Resulted in increased grain prices, starvation and smallpox epidemic. Known as Yua ya Ngomanisye, meaning the famine that went everywhere	East Africa, Kenya and Uganda	
1900–1903	Famine in Cape Verde	Cape Verde	11,000–20,000
1901	Northern Chinese Famine in Spring 1901, caused by drought from 1898-1901. The famine was one of the causes of the anti-imperialist Boxer rebellion.	China (Shanxi and Shaanxi provinces) and Inner Mongolia	200,000 in Shaanxi province.
1904–1906	Famine in Spain	Spain	
1906–1907	Chinese famine of 1906–1907	China	20,000,000–25,000,000
1913–1914	Famine, grain price rose "thirtyfold"	Ethiopia	
1914–1918	Mount Lebanon famine during World War I which was caused by the Entente and Ottoman blockade of food and to a swarm of locusts which killed up to 200,000 people, estimated to be half of the Mount Lebanon population	Lebanon	200,000
1914–1919	Famine caused by the Allied blockade of Germany during World War I until Germany signed the Treaty of Versailles.	Germany	763,000
1917	Famine in German East Africa	German East Africa	300,000
1917–1919	Persian famine of 1917–1919	Iran	2,000,000, but estimates range as high as 10,000,000
1918–1919	Rumanura famine in Ruanda-Burundi, causing large migrations to the Congo	Rwanda and Burundi (present day)	
1918-1920	Famine caused by Turkey during its invasion, blockade, and sabotaging of humanitarian supplies.	First Republic of Armenia	180,000 thousand Armenians, or roughly one-fifth of the population.
1919–1922	Kazakh famine of 1919–1922. A series of famines in Turkestan at the time of the Bolshevik revolution killed about a sixth of the population	Turkestan	
1920–1921	Famine in northern China	China	500,000
1920–1922	Famine in Cape Verde	Cape Verde	24,000–25,000
1921	Russian famine of 1921–1922	Russia	5,000,000
1921–1922	1921–1922 famine in Tatarstan	Russia	500,000–2,000,000
1921–1923	1921–1923 famine in Soviet Russian Ukraine	Ukraine	250,000–1,000,000
1924–1925	Famine in Volga German colonies in Russia. One-third of the entire population perished	Russia	
1924–1925	Minor famine in Ireland due to heavy rain	Irish Free State	
1926	Famine in Darfur	Darfur, Anglo-Egyptian Sudan	
1928–1929	Famine in Ruanda-Burundi, causing large migrations to the Congo	Rwanda and Burundi (present day)	
1928–1930	Chinese famine of 1928–1930 in northern China. The drought resulted in millions of deaths	China	3,000,000–10,000,000
1930–1934	First Kere	Madagascar	500,000
1932–1933	Soviet famine of 1932–1933, including famine in Ukraine, and famine in Kazakhstan, caused by Soviet collectivization policy, abnormal cold period, and bad harvests in the years of 1931–1932.	Russian SFSR, Ukrainian SSR, and Kazakh ASSR	5,000,000–7,000,000
1939–1952	Famine in Spain caused primarily by the implementation of the autarkic economy	Spain	200,000
1940–1943	Famine in Cape Verde	Cape Verde	20,000
1940–1945	Famine in Warsaw Ghetto, as well as other ghettos and concentration camps (note: this famine was the result of deliberate denial of food to ghetto residents on the part of Nazis).	Occupied Poland	
1940–1948	Famine in Morocco between 1940 and 1948, because of refueling system installed by France.	Morocco	200,000
1941–1944	Leningrad famine caused by a 900-day blockade by German troops. About a million Leningrad residents starved, froze, or were bombed to death in the winter of 1941–42, when supply routes to the city were cut off and temperatures dropped to −40 °C (−40 °F). According to other estimates about 800,000 out of an immediate pre-siege population of about 2.5 million perished.	Soviet Union	800,000–1,000,000
1941–1944	Famine in Greece caused by the Axis occupation.	Greece	300,000
1941–1942	Famine in Kharkiv. In a city with a population of about 450,000 while under German occupation, there was a famine starting in the winter of 1941–42 that lasted until the end of September 1942. The local administration recorded 19,284 deaths between the second half of December 1941 and the second half of September 1942, thereof 11,918 (59.6%) from hunger. The Foreign Office representative at Army High Command 6 noted on 25.03.1942 that according to reports reaching municipal authorities at least 50 people were dying of hunger every day, and that the true number might be much higher as in many cases the cause of death was stated as "unknown" and besides many deaths were not reported. British historian Alex Kay estimates that at least 30,000 city inhabitants died in the famine. According to Soviet sources about 70–80,000 people died of starvation in Kharkiv during the occupation by Nazi Germany.	Soviet Union	30,000–80,000
1941–1943	Famine in Kyiv. On April 1, 1942, well after the first winter of famine, Kyiv officially had about 352,000 inhabitants. In the middle of 1943—more than four months before the end of German rule—the city officially had about 295,600. Death by starvation was not the only reason for the rapid decline in population: deportation to Germany and Nazi shootings also played their part. Nevertheless, starvation was an important factor. British historian Alex Kay estimates that about 10,000 city inhabitants died of starvation.	Soviet Union	10,000
1942–1943	Chinese famine of 1942–1943	Henan, China	700,000 − 3,000,000
1942–1943	Iranian famine of 1942–1943, extended by some scholars from 1941 to 1945	Iran	4,000,000–7,000,000
1943	Bengal famine of 1943	Bengal, British India	2,100,000
1943–1944	Ruzagayura famine in Ruanda-Urundi, causing emigrations to Congo	Rwanda and Burundi (present day)	36,000–50,000
1943–1945	Famine in Hadhramaut	Yemen (present day)	10,000
1943–1946	Second Kere	Madagascar	1,000,000
1944–1945	Java under Japanese occupation	Java, Indonesia	2,400,000
1944–1945	Dutch famine of 1944–1945 during World War II	Netherlands	20,000
1944–1945	Vietnamese famine of 1944–1945	Vietnam	600,000–2,000,000
1945–1947	Famine in Königsberg (Kaliningrad)	Soviet Union	57,000–76,500
1946–1947	Hungerwinter	Germany	100,000+
1946–1947	Soviet famine of 1946–1947, drought.	Soviet Union	1,000,000–1,500,000
1946–1948	Famine in Cape Verde	Cape Verde	30,000
1949	Nyasaland famine of 1949	Malawi	200
1950	1950 Caribou Inuit famine	Canada	60
1955–1958	Third Kere	Madagascar	
1958	Famine in Tigray	Ethiopia	100,000
1959–1961	The Great Chinese Famine Some researchers also include the year 1958 or 1962.	China (mainland)	15,000,000–55,000,000
1966–1967	Lombok, drought and malnutrition, exacerbated by restrictions on regional rice trade	Indonesia	50,000
1966–1967	Rice crisis	Burma	
1967–1970	Famine caused by Nigerian Civil War and blockade	Biafra	2,000,000
1968–1972	Sahel drought created a famine that killed a million people	Mauritania, Mali, Chad, Niger and Burkina Faso	1,000,000
1970–1972	Fourth Kere	Madagascar	
1971–1973	Afghanistan drought	Afghanistan	
1972	Politically induced famine	Burundi	300,000
1972–1973	Famine in Ethiopia caused by drought and poor governance; failure of the government to handle this crisis led to the fall of Haile Selassie and to Derg rule	Ethiopia	60,000
1973	Darfur drought	Darfur, Sudan	1,000
1974	Bangladesh famine of 1974	Bangladesh	27,000–1,500,000
1975–1979	Famine under Khmer Rouge rule. A maximum estimate of 500,000 Cambodians lost their lives to famine	Cambodia	500,000
1980–1981	Caused by drought and conflict	Uganda	30,000
1980–1982	Fifth Kere	Madagascar	
1982–1983	Sixth Kere	Madagascar	230,000+
1982–1985	Famine caused by the Mozambican Civil War	Mozambique	100,000
1983–1985	1983–1985 famine in Ethiopia	Ethiopia	400,000–600,000
1984–1985	Famine caused by drought, economic crisis and the Second Sudanese Civil War	Sudan	240,000
1986–1987	Seventh Kere	Madagascar	7,600 in Antananarivo
1988	Famine caused by the Second Sudanese Civil War	Sudan	100,000
1988–1989	Eighth Kere	Madagascar	
1991–1992	Famine in Somalia caused by drought and civil war	Somalia	300,000
1992–1994	Ninth Kere	Madagascar	
1993	1993 Sudan famine	Sudan	20,000
1995–2000	North Korean famine. Scholars estimate 600,000 died of starvation (other estimates range from 200,000 to 3.5 million).	North Korea	200,000–3,500,000
1995–1996	Tenth Kere	Madagascar	
1997–1998	Eleventh Kere	Madagascar	
1998	1998 Sudan famine caused by war and drought	Sudan	70,000
1998	1998 Afghanistan famine	Afghanistan	
1998–2000	Famine in Ethiopia. The situation worsened by Eritrean–Ethiopian War	Ethiopia	
1998–2004	Second Congo War. 2.7 million people died, mostly from starvation and disease	Democratic Republic of the Congo	2,700,000
2003–2005	Famine during the War in Darfur	Sudan	200,000
2004–2005	Twelfth Kere	Madagascar	
2005–2006	2005–2006 Niger food crisis. At least three million were affected in Niger and 10 million throughout West Africa	Niger and West Africa	47,755
2009–2013	Thirteenth Kere	Madagascar	
2011–2012	Famine in Somalia, brought on by the 2011 East Africa drought	Somalia	285,000
2012	Famine in West Africa, brought on by the 2012 Sahel drought	Senegal, Gambia, Niger, Mauritania, Mali, Burkina Faso	
2014–2017	Fourteenth Kere	Madagascar	
2016–present	Famine in Yemen, arising from the Yemeni Civil War and the subsequent blockade of Yemen by Saudi Arabia	Yemen	85,000 children as of 2017. Unknown number of adults.
2017	Famine in South Sudan. Famine in Somalia, due to 2017 Somali drought.	South Sudan, Unity State and Somalia	
2020–present	Famine in the Tigray War	Tigray, Ethiopia	150,000–200,000+
2021–present	Fifteenth Kere (2021–present Madagascar famine)	Madagascar	
2021–present	Aftermath of the War in Afghanistan	Afghanistan	
2023	Blockade of Nagorno-Karabakh	Nagorno-Karabakh	1
2023–2025	Gaza Strip famine	Gaza Strip, Palestine	440+ (reported by GHM as of 21 September 2025)
2024–present	2024 famine in Haiti	Haiti	
2024–present	Famine in Sudan (2024–present)	Sudan	522,000+
2025–present	2025 hunger crisis in Syria	Syria	

== See also ==
=== Main article lists ===
- Bengal famine
- Droughts and famines in Russia and the Soviet Union
- Famine in India
- Famines in the Czech lands
- Famines in Ethiopia
- Great Bengal famine of 1770
- Great Famine of 1876–1878
- Great Chinese Famine
- Holodomor
- List of famines in China
- North Korean famine
- Timeline of major famines in India during British rule

=== Other articles ===
- 2007–2008 world food price crisis
- 2010–2012 world food price crisis
- 2022–2023 global food crises
- Disaster
- Famine Early Warning Systems Network
- Famine events
- Famine relief
- Famine scales
- Food security
- Food security during the COVID-19 pandemic
- List of natural disasters by death toll
- Live Aid
- Medieval demography
- Population decline
- Potato famine
- Starvation
- Theories of famines
- World population

== Bibliography ==
- Abrahamian, Ervand (2013). The Coup: 1953, the CIA, and the roots of modern U.S.–Iranian relations. New York: New Press, The. ISBN 978-1-59558-826-5.
- Alfani, Guido; Ó Gráda, Cormac (2017). Famine in European History. Cambridge University Press. ISBN 978-1-316-84123-5.
  - Alfani, Guido; Ó Gráda, Cormac (2017a). "1 - Famines in Europe: An Overview". Famine in European History. Cambridge: Cambridge University Press. pp. 1–24. ISBN 9781107179936.
  - Moreda, Vicente Pérez (2017). "3 - Spain". Famine in European History. Cambridge: Cambridge University Press. pp. 48–72. ISBN 9781107179936.
  - Collet, Dominik; Krämer, Daniel (2017). "5 - Germany, Switzerland and Austria". Famine in European History. Cambridge: Cambridge University Press. pp. 101–118. ISBN 9781107179936.
  - Hoyle, Richard (2017). "7 - Britain". Famine in European History. Cambridge: Cambridge University Press. pp. 141–165. ISBN 9781107179936.
  - Ó Gráda, Cormac (2017). "8 - Ireland". Famine in European History. Cambridge: Cambridge University Press. pp. 166–184. ISBN 9781107179936.
  - Dribe, Martin; Olsson, Mats; Svensson, Patrick (2017). "9 - Nordic Europe". Famine in European History. Cambridge: Cambridge University Press. pp. 185–211. ISBN 9781107179936.
    - For an open-access near-equivalent of this chapter, see Dribe, Martin; Olsson, Mats; Svensson, Patrick (2015). "Famines in the Nordic countries, AD 536 - 1875". Lund Papers in Economic History. General Issues (138). Department of Economic History, Lund University.
- Alfani, Guido; Mocarelli, Luca; Strangio, Donatella (2015). "Italian Famines: An overview (ca. 1250-1810)". Working Papers (84). "Carlo F. Dondena" Centre for Research on Social Dynamics (DONDENA), Università Commerciale Luigi Bocconi. Accessed at https://dondena.unibocconi.eu/sites/default/files/media/attach/Dondena_WP084.pdf on 2025-03-15.
- Dyson, Tim (1991). "On the Demography of South Asian Famines: Part I". Population Studies. 45 (1): 5–25. doi:10.1080/0032472031000145056. JSTOR 2174991. PMID 11622922.
- Farris, William Wayne (2006-01-01). Japan's Medieval Population: Famine, Fertility, And Warfare in a Transformative Age. University of Hawaii Press. ISBN 978-0-8248-2973-5.
- Katouzian, Homa (2013). Iran: A Beginner's Guide. Oneworld Publications. ISBN 9781780742731.
- Ó Gráda, Cormac (2009). Famine: a short history. Princeton University Press. ISBN 978-0-691-12237-3.
- Rubin, Barry (2015). The Middle East: A Guide to Politics, Economics, Society and Culture. Routledge. ISBN 9781317455783.
