= Kyōhō famine =

1732–1733 famine in Kyushu, Japan during the Edo period

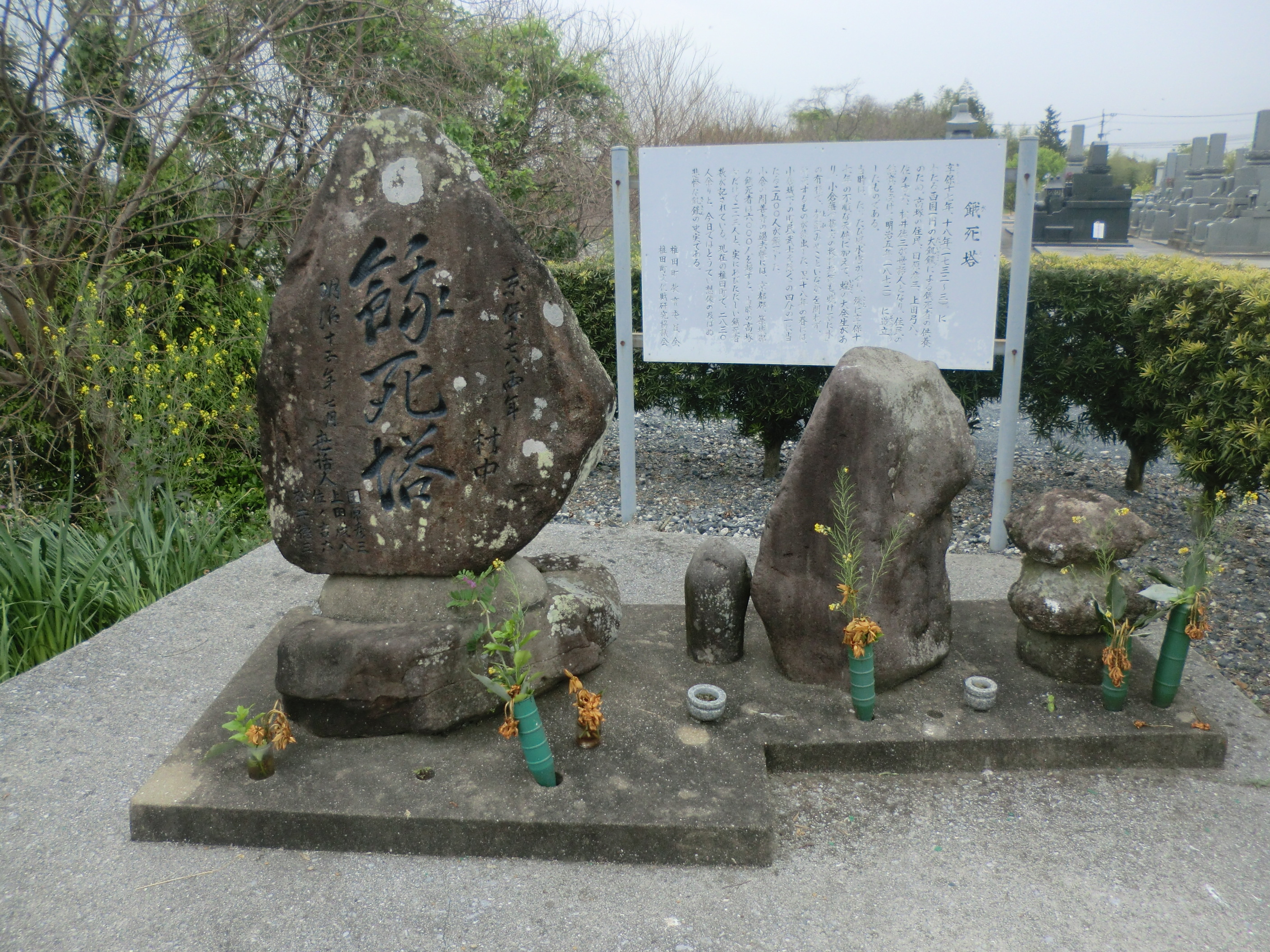

The Kyōhō famine (享保の大飢饉, Kyōhō no daikikin), was a famine on the Japanese island of Kyushu during the reign of Emperor Nakamikado in the Edo period. It is estimated that 12,172-169,000 people died from starvation. The famine, named after the Kyōhō era (1716–1736), is considered to have begun in 1732 and lasted until 1733. The ruling shōgun during the famine was Tokugawa Yoshimune.

== Precursor ==
The cause of the famine is not known. The Kyōhō Reforms ruling in 1728 increased taxes from 40% to 50% may have reduced agricultural productivity and food stocks. The 1730 ruling, introducing obligatory rice buying quotas for Han estate owners and wealthy merchants, turned rice into a cash crop and reduced diversity of Japanese crops. The scarcity of sesame oil and whale oil for treating seeds may have contributed to the severity of the later insect infestation.

== Famine ==
Starting in December 1731 heavy rains damaged the winter cereal crops (wheat and barley) and communities had difficulty re-planting fields because seed reserves had been diminished by years of marginal harvests. From May to June 1732, the cold, wet weather continued for two months in the Chūgoku, Shikoku, and Kyushu regions, resulting in favourable conditions for the proliferation of insects and caused rice seedlings to rot. Either an unka (insect) (a type of insect found in Japan) or a locust infestation appeared in the Seto Inland Sea region and proceeded to destroy rice paddies across western Japan, leaving only 10% of crops unaffected. The total rice harvest in Japan in 1732 was 630,000 koku - only 27% of average. Also, an epizootic (an epidemic among animals) broke out in July 1732, that affected draft animals in Fukuoka Domain. The prices of rice soared, reaching 5 to 7 times the normal value during the peak of the famine. Consequently, fishing villages relying on cash products to purchase food were hit hard, losing up to one third of the population. Average population die-off reported in Fukuoka Domain was 20% (66,000 of 320,000), while inland villages suffered less than 10% deaths. The majority of deaths were among children. Southern Kyushu was affected, but the mortality was less than in Northern Kyushu. At least 5919 deaths from starvation were recorded in Iyo-Matsuyama Domain, where people resorted to eating bracken and kudzu roots, straw and wood flour. During the New Year celebrations of 1733, the household utensils and rice sacks of merchant Takama Denbii (高間伝兵衛) were thrown into the river by a farmer mob of 1,700 men enraged by rumours of him hoarding food, in the event known in Japan as Kyōhō housebreaking - Japan's first recorded strike action.

The famine gradually ended in March 1733.

== Aftermath ==
According to official records, the death toll was 12,172. Actual death toll may have reached 169,000. The number of 969,900 deaths provided in Tokugawa Jikki is likely an exaggeration and is not confirmed by other sources. The role of sweet potato (smuggled in 1711 by Asami Kichijūrō Hidetaka from Satsuma Domain) in averting famine at Ōmishima in the Seto Inland Sea region was noted and the sweet potato was consequently widely adopted across Japan. The Shogunate implemented in 1735 reforms to diversify crops. Peasants were allowed to grow cash crops or technical crops (oil or fiber plants) in exchange for paying extra taxes.

It is speculated that the Sumidagawa Fireworks Festival was established in response to the Kyōhō famine.

The Kyōhō famine had a large negative impact on the Kyōhō Reforms.

== Notes and references ==
This article incorporates material from the article 享保の大飢饉 in the Japanese Wikipedia, retrieved on 5 July 2017.

== See also ==
- List of famines
- Kanshō famine
- Tenpō famine
- Kan'ei Great Famine
