= Yōwa famine =

Japanese famine (1181-1182)

Coordinates: 35.011667°N 135.768333°E

The Yōwa famine (養和の飢饉, Yōwa no kikin), was a famine which affected Japan at the end of Heian period. It began in 1180, and lasted until 1182. It was named after the Yōwa era (1181–1182), during the reign of Emperor Antoku. The shogunate system was not established in Japan yet. The famine was most severe in central and western Japan (especially Kinai) and caused by an alternating, untimely drought and flood.

== Causes ==
During the same period, there was also the Genpei War (1180–1185), partially caused by famine itself. In 1181, the Taira clan food requisitions in Yamashiro Province for the needs of starving Kyoto city have cost them popular support, while Minamoto no Yoritomo supplied rice for the starving provinces in exchange for grants for independent rule in Kamakura. One result of this war was that Minamoto no Yoshinaka's rebellion made the roads around Kyoto impassable, hindering the city's supply and leaving its residents with little clothing or food. Armies foraging also reduced the availability of food.

1180 saw drought and a poor harvest, the mid- and late-Heian period apparently having been unusually warm.

The famine become worse in 1182, as epidemic was superimposed on scarcity of food.

== Results ==
The food prices rose to such levels that a man's load of processed timber was not worth the amount of food to survive a day. The riverbanks were lined with the deceased. According to Hojoki, the number of dead in Kyoto was 42,300, and temples were overwhelmed, resulting in improper burials. Many corpses were left to rot, resulting in foul smells in several districts of the city. Residents of Kyoto demolished their houses, sold their possessions and fled the city.

Due to a lack of provisions (due, in turn, to the famine), the Genpei War was paused for two years from mid-1181.

== See also ==
- Great Tenmei famine
- Kan'ei Great Famine
- Kanshō famine
- List of famines

== Bibliography ==
- Farris, William Wayne (1 January 2006). Japan's Medieval Population: Famine, Fertility, And Warfare in a Transformative Age. University of Hawaii Press. ISBN 978-0-8248-2973-5.

This page is based on Japanese Wikipedia page 養和の飢饉, accessed 8 July 2019
