= Kanshō famine =

1459–1461 famine in Japan

The Kanshō famine (長禄・寛正の飢饉, Chōroku-kanshō no kikin), was a famine which affected mostly western Japan from 1459 to 1461 (or Chōroku-3 to Kanshō-2, in the Japanese calendar.), during the reign of Emperor Go-Hanazono in the Muromachi period. The ruling shōgun during the famine was Ashikaga Yoshimasa. The number of deaths from starvation was at least 82,000.

== Causes ==
The ongoing conflict in the Kantō region following Kyōtoku Incident in 1454, plus general incompetence in the administration of Ashikaga Yoshimasa leading up to the Ōnin War contributed to poor agricultural production and a sluggish response to the famine, greatly increasing its death toll.

== Famine ==
A general drought in Japan began in March 1459. It ended in September 1459 with a severe typhoon, flooding the Kamo River and causing major damage. Rare astronomical phenomena were reported, including sun dogs and a meteor colliding with the moon, possibly connected to the Little Ice Age. Taking an opportunity, Tokusei Ikki rebels has got additional footholds in November 1459.

Ashikaga Yoshimasa did not take any action, as he was completely obsessed with building a new shogunal residence, the Hanano gosho. The Emperor Go-Hanazono requested an emergency response, but was ignored. The drought continued on a smaller scale until May 1460, while damage from local floods and fighting (particularly between Hatakeyama Masanaga and Hatakeyama Yoshinari), resulted in trade disruption in Kyoto. The rice import ceased, which caused a severe shortage of food. In particular, the Katsura River flooded, while fighting for water in Toyama between temple priests and peasants was reported. By end of May 1460, a period of abnormally low temperatures and heavy rains began, and continued to the end of June. Even Lake Biwa flooded, submerging large parts of Ōmi Province, and causing population flight and the outbreak of plague among the refugees. Wet conditions resulted in insect proliferation, and the swarm of Inago locusts took off in autumn of 1460, further devastating rice paddies. By February 1461, the hunger deaths in Kyoto had reached 82,000 and corpses dammed the Kamo River.

On 22 January 1461, Ashikaga Yoshimasa finally took action and ordered the monk Gan'ami from Kōfuku-ji to handle the famine. A free kitchen providing meals of millet meals was established in February 1461 at the southern entrance of Rokkaku-dō, using charity funds from wealthy Kyoto citizens. The funding was exhausted in a month though. Similar action was forbidden by the leadership of Enryaku-ji temple, resulting in disobedience by Rennyo from Hongan-ji.

== Aftermath of the famine ==
The destruction of Hongan-ji in 1465 was the continuation of the debate started during Kanshō famine. Also, Ōnin War which broke out in 1467, was partially fueled by the displayed Shogunate ineptness during the Kanshō famine.

== Notes and references ==
This article incorporates material from the article 長禄・寛正の飢饉 in the Japanese Wikipedia, retrieved on 11 July 2017.

== See also ==
- List of famines
- Kan'ei Great Famine
- Kyōhō famine
- Great Tenmei famine
- Tenpō famine
