= Great Famine of Estonia =

The Great Famine of Estonia (also The Great Starvation) killed about a fifth of the population (70,000–100,000 people) of Swedish-ruled Estonia and Livonia in the years 1695–1697.

The climate was unfavorable for crops in 1694 and the summer of 1695 was cold and rainy, followed by an early autumn frost that destroyed the summer crops. Cold conditions continued during 1696, and rain fell throughout the summer. About a fifth of Estonian and Livonian population (70,000 to 75,000 people per one estimate, and 100,000 per another) died during the famine.

== General climate conditions ==
The famine occurred in a period known as the Little Ice Age. During the 1690s, climate in Europe was characterised by cold springs and summers. It is generally estimated that temperatures were 1.5 °C lower during the 1690s than the average during the Little Ice Age. This impacted other countries, France suffered the worst famine since the Middle Ages, ice floes formed in the Thames while Lake Constance and Lake Zurich froze completely over.

== Local climate impact ==
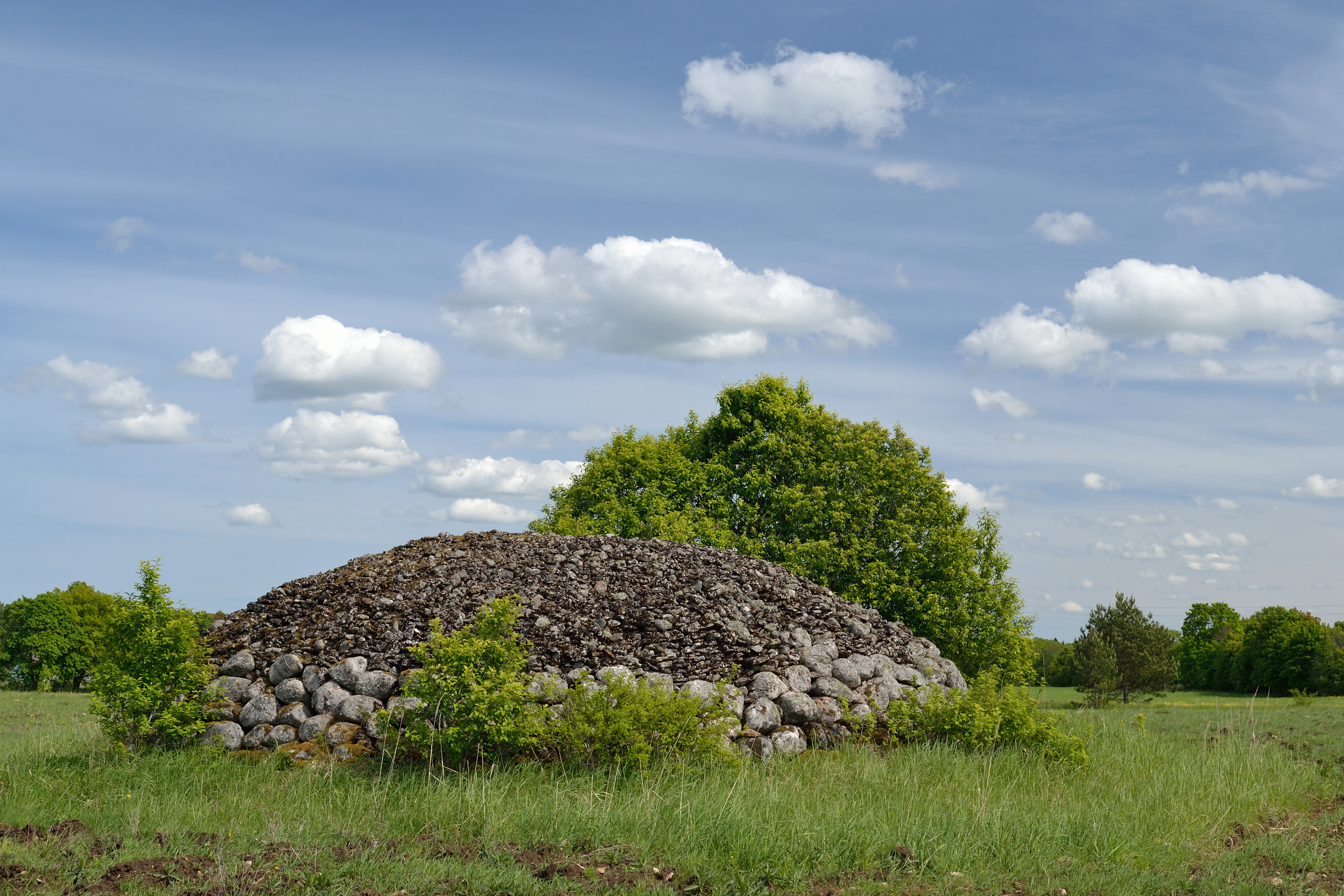
According to folk stories, these stones in Palmse were gathered from the fields as a sign of gratitude to the local baron, von Pahlen, who gave out grain for the people during the time of the Great Famine.

In the previous years of 1692 to 1694, harvests in Estonia were poor due to the shorter than normal summer growing seasons and longer winters. Seed stocks were reduced as a result.

Then in the summer of 1695 excessive rain fell, falling almost constantly from June 24 to September 29. This excess rain destroyed crops and hay as the low-lying land was flooded. This resulted in a shortage of seed for the following autumn and spring sowing seasons. The winter of 1695-96 was extremely cold, however the early spring thaw was short lived when winter conditions returned in March 1696, delaying sowing of the little available seed until the end of May. Heavy rains returned in the summer wrecking the harvest, with only between a fifth and a quarter of the seed planted being harvested. In some areas the crop yield was a little as three percent.

By the end of the summer in 1696 many peasants were destitute and hungry, farmhands, servants and even some members of the nobility were reduced to begging. By the autumn famine had taken hold and by October the death rate began to rise. The winter of 1696-97 was so severe that corpses could not be buried until the following spring. An estimated 70,000 people – one fifth or fourth of Estonian population died during the Great Famine.

== Regional impact ==
The availability of salt, a vital ingredient for preserving meat and fish, was affected by the colder climate. Portugal, the main source of salt to the Baltic region, was affected by excessive rain making salt production difficult. The shortage of salt meant that meat and fish could not be preserved, reducing stockpiles available for consumption.

At the time Estonia and Livonia were seen as the granaries of the Swedish Empire and large quantities of grain were shipped to Sweden and Finland. Due to the low status these provinces held in the empire, priority was given to the fulfilment of these export quotas. The Government in Stockholm were slow to react to the developing famine and did not relax their policies until 1697 when it was too late.

== Aftermath ==
Peter the Great cited the inadequate provisioning of Peter's retinue of 250 people and horses as they passed through the province during the famine in 1697 by the Swedish Governor General as one of the main pretexts for declaring war against Sweden in 1700, the Great Northern War.

== See also ==
- Great Famine of Finland (1695–1697)
- The plague during the Great Northern War
- Irish Famine (1740–1741)
- List of famines
- Little Ice Age

== Sources ==
- 1558–1710. Estonia under Swedish rule - Population
