= Ralava Beboarimisa =

Malagasy politician

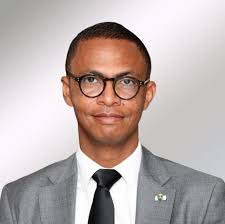
- Beboarimisa in 2023

Minister of Environment, Ecology, Sea and Forests
- In office January 2015 – April 2016

Minister of Transport and Meteorology
- In office August 2017 – January 2019

Personal details
- Born: 1977 (age 48–49) Madagascar
- Education: Université Paris XII; INSEAD; IHEDN
- Profession: Politician, financier

Ralava Beboarimisa (born 1977) is a Malagasy politician, financier, and environmental advocate. He was the Minister of Environment, Ecology, Sea and Forests (now the Ministry of Environment and Sustainable Development) from 2015 to 2016, and the Minister of Transport and Meteorology from 2017 to 2019, serving under the governments of Jean Ravelonarivo, Olivier Mahafaly Solonandrasana, and Christian Ntsay.

== Early life and education ==
Beboarimisa studied finance and international relations in France, later completing executive education in leadership at INSEAD in 2011 and at the Institut des hautes études de défense nationale (IHEDN) in 2015. He began his career in investment banking in Paris at Fimat International Banque (Société Générale group) and later at Newedge, specializing in financial risk management and credit solutions for institutional clients.

== Career ==
In 2011, he returned to Madagascar as Executive Director of the Foundation for Protected Areas and Biodiversity of Madagascar (FAPBM). Under his leadership, the foundation’s endowment grew to about US$50 million, supporting more than 30 protected areas covering 3 million hectares. He also chaired the Consortium of African Funds for the Environment and led Madagascar’s 60‑member delegation to the IUCN World Parks Congress in Sydney in 2014.

Appointed Minister of Environment in January 2015, Beboarimisa represented Madagascar as chief negotiator at COP21 in Paris, advocating for climate finance and stronger support for vulnerable countries. He also submitted to Parliament the “Beboarimisa Law” (Law No. 2015‑056), adopted in December 2015, which created a special judicial mechanism to combat illegal trafficking of rosewood and ebony. The law reinforced penalties, prosecution capacity, and international cooperation, enabling Madagascar to secure the repatriation of rosewood shipments seized abroad, including 120 tons from Mauritius in 2016. During his ministerial tenure, Madagascar expanded protected areas to more than 7 million hectares and established new marine protected zones under the global “Promise of Sydney.” For a short time in 2016, his visibility led to speculation that he might succeed Jean Ravelonarivo as Prime Minister.

During his environmental ministry tenure, Beboarimisa faced scrutiny in 2016 over the seizure of over 1,000 tons of allegedly smuggled Malagasy rosewood in Singapore. He maintained that no exports were authorized and fully cooperated with investigations, while the United States government expressed support for Madagascar’s international legal efforts. In 2019, Singapore's Court of Appeal overturned convictions, deeming the logs in transit rather than illegally imported.

After a government reshuffle in August 2017, he became Minister of Transport and Meteorology, serving until January 2019. In this role he launched reforms in transport governance and safety, modernized meteorological services, and strengthened Madagascar’s cyclone early warning systems, notably through accession to the Climate Risk and Early Warning Systems (CREWS) program. He also oversaw major infrastructure projects, including the expansion of Tamatave (Toamasina) port and the construction of the new terminal at Ivato International Airport in Antananarivo.

== Civic initiatives ==
In October 2018, Beboarimisa founded the civic movement Bâtir la République, created to promote citizen engagement and democratic debate. The NGO organizes public forums on national history, particularly around 14 October 1958, the proclamation of Madagascar’s First Republic.

== International roles ==
On the international stage, Beboarimisa has taken part in several African Union Election Observation Mission. In December 2023, he joined the AU mission to the Democratic Republic of the Congo presidential election, led by former Malagasy president Hery Rajaonarimampianina.
