= 2021–present Madagascar famine =

Food insecurity in districts of southern Madagascar of mid-2021

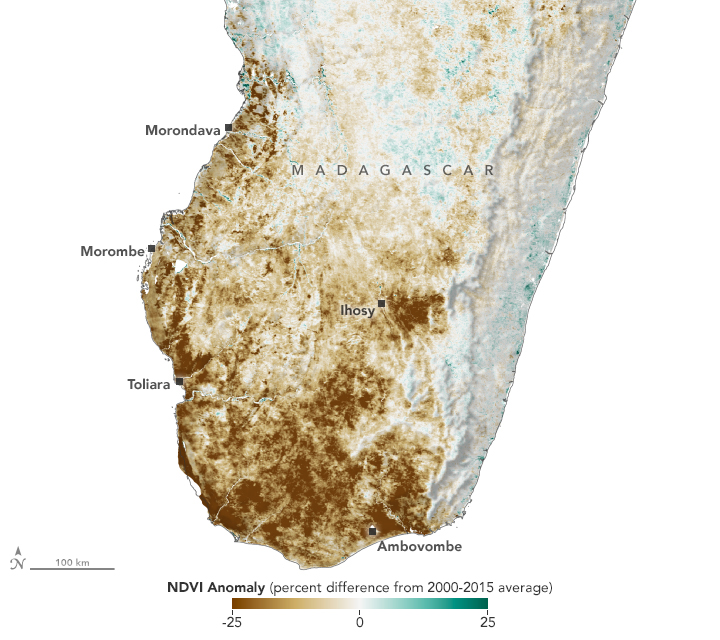
- Drought conditions in Southern Madagascar in 2021.
- Country: Madagascar
- Location: Southern Madagascar
- Period: June 2021 – present
- Theory: Severe drought, irregular rainfall

In mid-2021, a severe drought in southern Madagascar caused hundreds of thousands of people, with some estimating more than 1 million people including nearly 460,000 children, to suffer from food insecurity or Kere (famine). Some organizations have attributed the situation to the impact of climate change and the handling of the COVID-19 pandemic in the country. (Note: As of 3 October 2022, Madagascar reported 66,684 cases and 1,410 deaths from COVID-19.)

As of 2025, the famine is considered as an ongoing disaster.

== Background ==
Madagascar is frequently exposed to severe extreme weather and climate events. The Kere is a recurrent famine that has affected Madagascar's Deep South since the 1930s. Between 1980 and 2013, Madagascar experienced 63 major natural disasters, including cyclones, floods, severe droughts, earthquakes, epidemics, and a "locust plague of biblical proportions". In 2020, UNICEF had expressed early concerns about malnutrition in Madagascar, estimating that 42% of children under the age of five suffered from malnourishment. As of June 2021, the southern region of Madagascar was hit by the worst drought in 40 years. The situations further worsens because people in the area are smallholder farmers and depend on their own agriculture and homegrown meals. In late June 2021, David Beasley, the chief of the UN-agency World Food Programme (WFP) warned that a "catastrophic" hunger is hitting the region and the WFP has asked for $78.6 million in immediate aid. Another WFP official said the situation was the second worst food crisis he had seen in his life after the 1998 famine in Bahr el Ghazal, in present-day South Sudan.

An early report conducted in June 2021 by Duke University School of Nursing found that three-fourths of vanilla farmers in the northern Sava Region of Madagascar were also suffering from food insecurity due to fluctuations of the vanilla market and natural disasters, potentially indicating that the food crisis is spreading to other parts of Madagascar.

== Causes and events ==
The causes of the drought and subsequent food crisis have been attributed to the lack of rain which usually takes place in November and December and half of the usual rainfall occurring during October 2020. The scenes of the food crisis have been described as "horrific" and the World Bank has said that climate change has worsened the situation. The WFP further reported the impact of the COVID-19 pandemic in the country closed markets and prevented migratory workers from finding jobs.

By late June 2021, the WFP reported that 75% of children had abandoned school and were begging or foraging for food. Intense dust storms were further aggravating the circumstances. Humanitarian agencies also warned of water shortages and that a water pipeline inaugurated by UNICEF and the government of Madagascar in 2019 did not reach to provide fresh water to some parts of the south, forcing people to move more than 15 kilometers to seek water.

The WFP reported on 23 June 2021 that people were eating mud and that 500,000 were "knocking on famine's doors" while 800,000 others were directly heading to it.

On 30 June 2021, the WFP said that a "biblical" famine was approaching in several African countries, especially in Madagascar and that the SARS-CoV-2 Delta variant "impacted worse in low-income and underdeveloped nations amid a global pandemic". Reports of people eating raw red cactus fruits, wild leaves and locusts for months also arose. Meanwhile, United Nations Office for the Coordination of Humanitarian Affairs (OCHA) warned of "severe malnutrition" on 130,000 Malagasy children aged five and younger, by early June 2021. On 1 July 2021, UN agencies reported that in southern villages, people had resorted to eating ashes mixed with tamarind and shoe leather.

The UK-based organization SEED Madagascar reported that people are eating "cactuses, swamp plants, and insects", while also reporting that mothers are mixing clay and fruits to feed their families. Evidence of swollen stomachs and physically stunted children were also reported by the organization as symptoms of chronic malnutrition.

Local media has said that out of the 2.5 million people who live in the southern districts of Madagascar, around 1.2 million are already suffering from food insecurity, while another 400,000, are in a critical situation of famine, citing concerns equal to international organizations such as climate change, COVID-19 and political instability in the country.

Other outlets said that from October 2020 until April 2021, at least 750,000 people per month received emergency food assistance and cash transfers from the government. Of those people, there were 12,000 children aged 6 to 23 months, who were assisted. Pregnant and breastfeeding women also required nutritional supplements and fortified foods, in four critical southern districts. Also, media pointed to sources stating that since the start of 2021, around 56,000 children aged between 2 and 5 were treated for moderate malnutrition.

On 14 July 2021, a government report was issued, with collaboration of distinguished academic and professor Hanta Vololontiana. The report stated that the rate of chronic malnutrition was in decline and that the aim of the government was to decrease the prevalence of such condition from 47.3% to less than 38% and to keep the rate of acute malnutrition in children below the age of five, to below 5% overall. The government also pointed to a program to integrate agriculture, livestock, fisheries, water, sanitation and hygiene, social protection, education, environment and scientific research via specific nutrition, sensitive nutrition and governance.

By late July 2021, however, the situation was described as "famine" by outlets such as Al Jazeera and Time magazine. Al Jazeera published the story of a woman pleading for desperate help for her five-year-old girl in the Anosy region in the southernmost region of Madagascar. Also, Time quoted WFP's chief Beasley as describing the crisis as "climate change-caused" and the first in modern history to be caused by such phenomenon. He also warned the situation will worsen.

Beasley also added that children in Madagascar have no "energy to cry" and compared the scenes to a "horror film" saying that the situation currently being experienced by Madagascar is worse than those he had seen in the Central African Republic, Democratic Republic of the Congo, in the Republic of the Congo and in Sudan.

The UN continued to monitor the situation during July 2021, stating that children under the age of five with lifelong nutrition problems had increased to half a million and that over 110,000 were in "acute and severe malnutrition".

In August 2021, the food crisis was attributed to be the first famine caused by climate change and not conflict, according to WFP official Shelley Thakral. The claim of the famine being caused by climate change was contradicted by a study released December 1, 2021 by World Weather Attribution.

== Reactions and responses ==
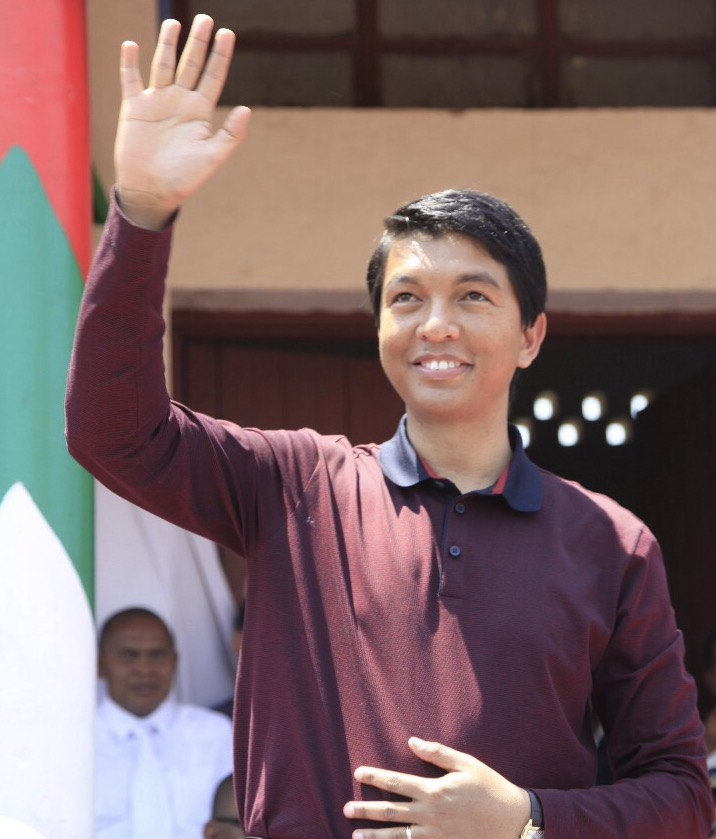
The government of president Andry Rajoelina received backlash over the situation, with one journalist confronting him on the issue during a press conference.

Various agencies and governments have pledged help to Madagascar to combat the edging famine and food crisis. The Malagasy government pledged aid with the support of the United Nations and WFP, with the aim of helping 1.14 million Malagasy people on the edge of starvation. Leaders of the G20 group also discussed the situation and pledged to do more to help the world's hungry and to combat climate change with Italian Foreign Minister Luigi Di Maio giving a conference on the issue. The G20 also announced the "Matera Declaration" a call to do more on food insecurity. The United States government pledged an additional $40 million in aid in June to combat hunger in southern Madagascar during an announcement made by US ambassador to Madagascar Michael Pelletier along with Malagasy President Andry Rajoelina. The ambassador also urged the government to help its people. The government of South Korea pledged $200,000 in humanitarian aid to Madagascar.

François Gemenne, an environmental researcher and academic affiliated with the United Nations and the University of Liège, stated that the worsening famine in Madagascar was not entirely caused by climate change. He cited the example that similar environmental impacts would not lead to famine in a country like France, highlighting the role of deeper systemic factors. Instead, he pointed to political motives, including years of political instability in Madagascar, as significant contributors to the crisis.

The government also issued a decree granting 15,000 households with butane gas and a free stove kit to replace other resources. The butane gas, earlier considered a luxury, will be available as an alternative for energy substitution compared to charcoal.

Mark Jacobs, of the UK-based organization SEED Madagascar, also blamed climate change and the COVID-19 pandemic for the famine and warned of rising prices in food in the areas where the organization works in the country. Jacobs also called people, especially business people in Hertfordshire, where the organization is based, to donate and help increase the budget of £100,000.

Médecins Sans Frontières (MSF) began to set up mobile clinics in the country in March 2021 in anticipation of the incoming drought. According to the organization, they have set up in the town of Ambovombe, in the southern tip of Ambovombe District and have helped 4,339 suffering from different levels of malnutrition. MSF also warned that the condition of malnourished children further worsened by complicating diseases such as malaria (affecting 22% of young patients), respiratory infections (18 percent), and diarrheal diseases (14 percent). MSF has also begun to treat inpatient care.

Gaëlle Borgia, an investigative researcher and journalist, said that signs of the food insecurity situation were visible long earlier in 2020 and had warned that if the Malagasy authorities seemed reluctant to admit the situation, it was difficult to ignore the multiple alerts recorded for months, including that of the United Nations.

The government of President Andry Rajoelina received backlash over the edging famine, with a journalist confronting him during a press conference in Antananarivo.

On 16 July 2021, at a summit of African leaders, Rajoelina pleaded to world leaders to act on climate change referencing the situation in the south of Madagascar. He also reported that a UN representative and the Swiss ambassador to Madagascar had recently visited Ambovombe to check the situation.

My compatriots in the South are suffering a heavy toll from the climate crisis in which they did not participate.

—Andry Rajoelina, president of Madagascar, July 2021.

A report of July 2021 said that if "no action is taken", the situation is going to peak by January 2022 and to worsen drastically between October and December 2021, with insufficient food stock and inflation caused by COVID-19. It also predicted that up to more than 500,000 people will be in phase 4 of malnutrition.

On 19 July 2021, Rajoelina called for a "radical and lasting change" during a summit of the International Development Association in Abidjan, in Ivory Coast. Rajoelina criticized those who cause climate change by saying that "my compatriots in the South are suffering a heavy toll from the climate crisis in which they did not participate." and promised more help to the south and empowerment of women.

The Secretary General of the United Nations, António Guterres, also pled on social media for help for Malagasy people.

In late July 2021, the U.S. embassy further expanded its aid through USAID to more than 100,000 people in the south providing food to children and pregnant women facing malnutrition. The embassy also donated further $7.5 million dollars.

German Roman Catholic bishops have pled for help for children in southern Madagascar, with Archbishop Ludwig Schick leading efforts to raise awareness of the situation of famine in the country.

In late August 2021, a United Nations resident coordinator for Madagascar, Issa Sanogo, warned that the situation was still critical and warned that "the hunger season is coming" as he also said that further 500,000 children are at risk during the course of the near future. The United Nations repeated its warning that the country is on the verge of a "humanitarian crisis."

In November 2021, ABC World News Tonight travelled to the area, with anchor David Muir reporting from there. As a result of the airing of the report, around 22,000 donors amounted to $2.7 million in aid, which will directly go to WFP to help on the ground.

In October 2022, UNICEF contributed with $23 millions for children suffering from the famine, which continued in the south, with a third of the population suffering from the disaster, according to researchers cited by the Financial Times.

As of 2024, southern Madagascar continues to face a severe humanitarian crisis, with an estimated 1.63 million people experiencing high levels of acute food insecurity (IPC Phase 3 or above), particularly in the South and Southeast. According to the World Food Programme’s 2024 Annual Country Report, the crisis has been driven by a combination of climate shocks—including drought, Tropical Storm Alvaro, and Cyclone Gamane—and persistent economic instability. In response, WFP provided emergency food assistance and cash transfers to affected communities, reaching over 2.39 million beneficiaries across the country between March and December 2024.

== See also ==
- 2022 food crises
- Food security during the COVID-19 pandemic
- Climate change in Madagascar
- List of famines
