= Ministry of Environment and Sustainable Development (Madagascar) =

Ministry of Environment and Sustainable Development

Ministry of Environment and Sustainable Development (MEDD) is a governmental ministry with Manesimana Rafanomezantsoa Michaël as the current minister and head of the ministry. The ministry is accountable for creating, organizing, carrying out, and supervising national policies pertaining to sustainable development, natural resource management, and environmental protection. It is essential to preserving Madagascar's distinctive biodiversity and tackling environmental issues in accordance with national and international obligations.

== Ministers ==
- Charles Sylvain Rabotoarison - 2010 till 2015
- Ralava Beboarimisa - 2015 till 2016
- Baomiavotse Vahinala Raharinirina Douguet - 2020 till 2024
- Max Andonirina Fontaine 2024 till 2025
- Manesimana Rafanomezantsoa Michaël - 2025 till date
