= Baomiavotse Vahinala Raharinirina Douguet =

Malagasy academic

Baomiavotse Vahinala Raharinirina
- Education: Ph.D. in Economics
- Alma mater: University of Versailles Saint Quentin, France
- Occupations: Associate Professor, Politician
- Known for: Minister of Environment and Sustainable Development, Madagascar

Baomiavotse Vahinala Raharinirina is an associate professor at the University of Fianarantsoa and a political figure from Madagascar.

== Biography ==
Baomiavotse Vahinala Raharinirina holds a Ph.D. in Economics and a Master's degree (DEA) in Integrated Social and Territorial Economic Development. Since April 2023, she has served as Special Advisor to the President of Madagascar for Economic Affairs and the Private Sector. Previously, she was Chief of Staff to the President of Madagascar from March 2022 to April 2023. During the cabinet reshuffle of the Ntsay Government on January 29, 2020, she was appointed Minister of Environment and Sustainable Development.

Prior to her political career in Madagascar, from 2009 to 2015, she was a lecturer at the University of Versailles Saint Quentin in France, and in Malagasy higher education institutions. She was a researcher for the European Commission from February 2012 to March 2015, working on environmental justice research projects. From 2015 to 2017, she served as Educational Director at the Terra Institute, and subsequently as a Corporate Social Responsibility (CSR) consultant from May 2018 to January 2020.
