= Potato famine =

Potato famine may refer to:

- European Potato Famine, or European potato failure, an agrarian crisis in the mid-1840s, including:
  - Great Famine (Ireland), 1845–1852
  - Highland Potato Famine, in Scotland, 1846–1856
