= 1846–1848 Newfoundland potato famine =

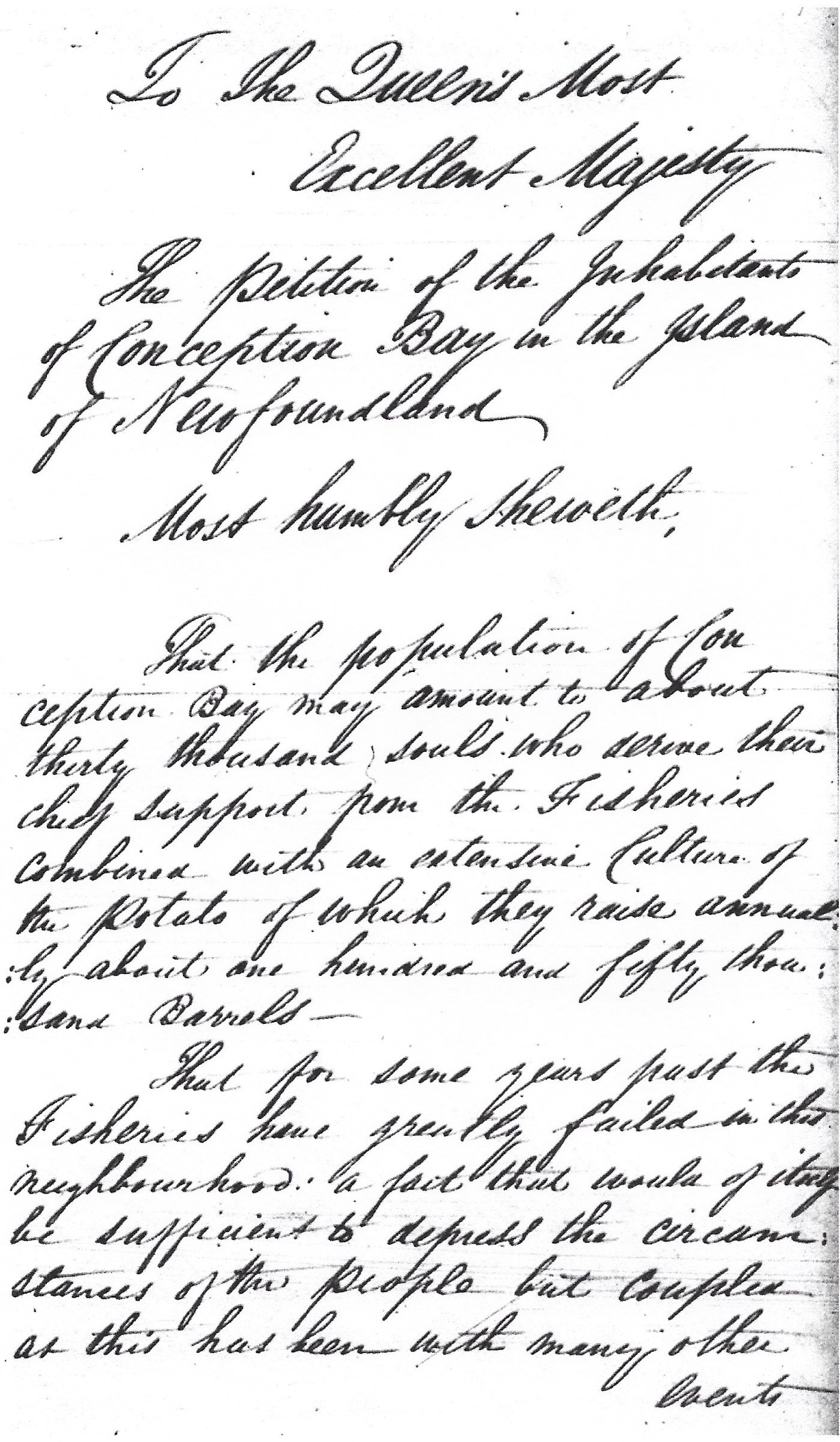
Petition to Queen Victoria for Famine Relief, from the Citizens of Conception Bay, Newfoundland, October 20, 1847 (first page)

The islands of Newfoundland and Ireland, in addition to sharing similar northern latitudes and facing each other across the Atlantic Ocean, also had in common, during the middle of the 19th century, a heavy dependence on a single agricultural crop, the potato—a dependence that allowed the same blight that precipitated the Great Famine in Ireland to wreak havoc on this former British colony as well. Though acute, and the source of great suffering, the famine in Newfoundland lasted for fewer years than its Irish contemporary, which extended from 1845 to 1849. Beginning a year later, in 1846, it ended with the return to prosperity of the local fisheries in the spring and summer of 1848.

== Background and context ==
The first known outbreak of the potato blight, Phytophthora infestans, occurred in the eastern United States in 1843. As the blight spread to the north, it also crossed the ocean, reaching the potato fields of Ireland in September 1845, three months before completing its journey along the American coast and arriving on the Southern Shore of Newfoundland.

Although the blight destroyed potato crops throughout North America and Europe, most of the populated regions in the Northern Hemisphere maintained an agricultural diversity sufficient to withstand the loss of the potato. Ireland, however, suffered severely, with millions relying on the potato as nearly their sole source of sustenance. Newfoundland at the time, with a population that was 50% Irish, also relied heavily on its potato crop, but had the advantage of bountiful fisheries (seals in the spring, codfish in the summer).

== Failure of the fisheries ==
The famine in Newfoundland was preceded by an unusual train of disasters that greatly aggravated the effects of the blight when it arrived. The returns from the annual seal hunt in the spring of 1846 had been disappointing. In June a major fire in the capital of St. John's destroyed its waterfront and most of its mercantile premises. As the summer progressed, the poor returns from the seal hunt were matched by an equally unsuccessful cod fishery. Then, in September, an unusually strong gale swept across the island, destroying fishing premises, boats, and supplies, including winter provisions. With its mercantile establishments already in ashes, St. John's businesses were unable to deliver to the smaller villages the supplies that were essential to recovery and to preparation for the harsh Newfoundland winter.

By December 1846, even before the blight had spread beyond the south coast, numerous communities were reporting a scarcity of food, and there was little hope for the timely arrival of relief. Most if not all of the island was inaccessible throughout the winter, with harbors frozen until the following spring, and the colony had no means of communication with either Europe or mainland America.

When harbors re-opened in the spring of 1847, the traditional seal hunt began with thousands of Newfoundlanders sailing to the ice fields, laboring under an acute shortage of provisions. Much as in the previous spring, many found no seals and returned to shore, several months later, "without a morsel of food or a penny in their pockets." This second unsuccessful seal hunt was followed by a summer cod fishery that was also as dismal as the previous year's. With the failure of its fisheries for the second consecutive year, the inhabitants of Newfoundland fell into the same precarious position as those in Ireland, dependent for sustenance on a single agricultural crop.

== Progress of the blight ==
Until the fall of 1847, the potato blight and resulting hunger in Newfoundland had been limited to the Southern Shore. In September, however, the disease advanced rapidly from the south coast and swept across the island, destroying the last significant source of nutrition. Potato fields that "had never been known to fail" were turned into wastelands, and Newfoundlanders rushed to harvest and store potatoes still unaffected by the blight. As the fall progressed, however, the potatoes that had been harvested and stored suddenly succumbed to blight in storage. As the editor of the Harbour Grace newspaper stated, "The potatoes are gone; literally vanished; they are left undug; or thrown up in putrid heaps poisonous to the very hogs that are suffered to touch them."

== Arrivals from Ireland ==
Compounding the tragedy that was unfolding in Newfoundland was the arrival of ships from Ireland filled with emaciated passengers who, hoping to escape starvation by joining relatives and former neighbors who had immigrated to Newfoundland earlier in the century, found that they had reached a land that itself was facing a severe shortage of food.

== Failure of relief efforts ==
In November 1847, upon the total failure of the potato crop, the American missionary Robert Traill Spence Lowell made a widespread plea for relief. In correspondence to U.S. newspapers, Lowell described the Newfoundland fishery as "a deplorable failure" and wrote of the potato blight's "fearful ravages of the only staple crop on the Island." He urged the American people, in raising funds for the famished in Ireland, to "not turn away from the appeal of the wretched much nearer home."

Similarly, the editor of the Harbour Grace newspaper described the conditions in Conception Bay, Newfoundland, writing that "[T]housands of our population in this bay are in a starving condition - that it is painful - distressing - harrowing to meet them in the street - to have them at our doors - to see them fainting at our hearths."

Along with other half-hearted measures for dealing with the pervasive hunger, the Colonial Governor John Gaspard Le Marchant proposed that the famished eat less, declaring a "Day of Public Fasting and Humiliation" in hopes the Almighty may pardon their sins and "withdraw his afflicting hand." (Note: Quoting LeMarchant, Gaspard, Proclamation, May 18, 1848.) Editors of most Newfoundland newspapers agreed with him; they, too blaming the famine on the human weaknesses of indolence and improvidence. Many urged the denial of government relief, in the belief that, as a consequence of providing it, "the whole of the lower classes will become beggars by profession, and every principle of independence destroyed."

== Comparison with the Irish famine ==
In some respects, the Newfoundland potato famine differed significantly from the Great Famine of Ireland. Less burdened by overpopulation, Newfoundland didn't experience the mass evictions and emigration that dramatically impacted Ireland in the wake of the famine. Recovery in Newfoundland began sooner, when a successful seal hunt was followed by the return of large quantities of cod in 1848; and, despite a return of the blight in the fall of that year, recovery in Newfoundland was faster, and its long-term impact less acute.

In other respects, the two famines were similar. Both islands experienced the same blight at roughly the same time. At the height of starvation, both were exporting large quantities of food (grain from Ireland, fish from Newfoundland). The posture of government leaders, and the newspapers that reflected their points of view, were strikingly similar, with the Times of London and the Times of St. John's both insisting that the famine was a gift from Providence, sent to cure the moral defects of an indolent people.

The deaths from the Great Famine in Ireland, from starvation and starvation-related diseases, have been estimated to be in the range of one million, with two million more Irish leaving for other lands. The number of deaths in Newfoundland remains unknown.
