= Wei County =

Wei County may refer to the following locations in China:

- Wei County, Handan (魏县), Hebei
- Wei County, Xingtai (威县), Hebei
- Weifang (潍县), formerly Wei County, Shandong
  - Weixian Internment Camp
