= Famines in the Czech lands =

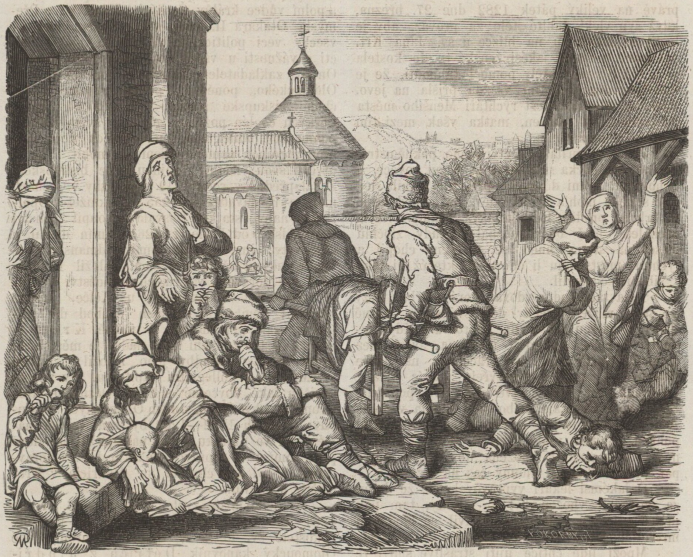
Great famine in Prague in 1281 and 1282 (Česko-moravská kronika book illustration, 1862)

This article discusses historical famines that have occurred in what is now the Czech Republic. Various famines occurred throughout the Czech lands between 1272 and 1847. Excessive rain, cold temperatures, hail, warfare, and disease are the main causes of famines in the Czech lands.

== Recorded famines ==
=== The thirteenth and fourteenth centuries ===
The first recorded famine in the Czech lands occurred from 1272 to 1282 and was caused by warfare and weather, which decreased the volume of crops harvested in the region. This first instance of famine caught the inhabitants off guard and caused 600,000 deaths, mostly through endemic plagues, although there were some occurrences of cannibalism. Local famines also transpired in Czech regions in 1318, caused by warfare; and then in 1361 and 1366, caused by crop shortage and failures.

=== The hungry years (1432–1434) ===
The years 1432 through 1434 were known as the hungry years in the Czech lands because they faced climate issues for the duration of the Hussite Wars. The Hussite Wars were fought in Bohemia between the followers of the executed Jan Hus, a contributor to the Protestant movement. This set of wars was one of the first known military actions fought with hand-held firearms. The final two years of this fourteen-year set of wars sparked an increase in the price of grain. At one point grain was six times the price it had been prior to the wars. People in the Czech lands were unable to afford grain until the price returned to an affordable rate.

=== The sixteenth and eighteenth centuries ===
Around 1560 a decrease in temperature resulted in another disappointing harvest.

A famine following the War of the Austrian Succession in 1748 killed 1,200 people in Doksy, a town in the northern Czech lands.

=== The Great Famine (1770–1771) ===
The next recorded famine in the Czech lands was the Great Famine, which lasted from 1770 until 1771. The cause of the Great Famine was a disease of grain monoculture and heavy rains. This famine ended when the Czech lands imported food and increased potato production by 100 percent. The Great Famine killed twelve percent of the Czech lands' population, up to 500,000 inhabitants, and radicalized the countryside, which led to peasant uprisings, like the peasant revolt of 1775 in Bohemia.

=== Later famine ===
The last famine in the Czech lands was in Czech Silesia in 1847. This famine was caused by a potato disease and led to the deaths of over 20,000 people.
