= Tenpō famine =

Famine in Japan during the Edo period

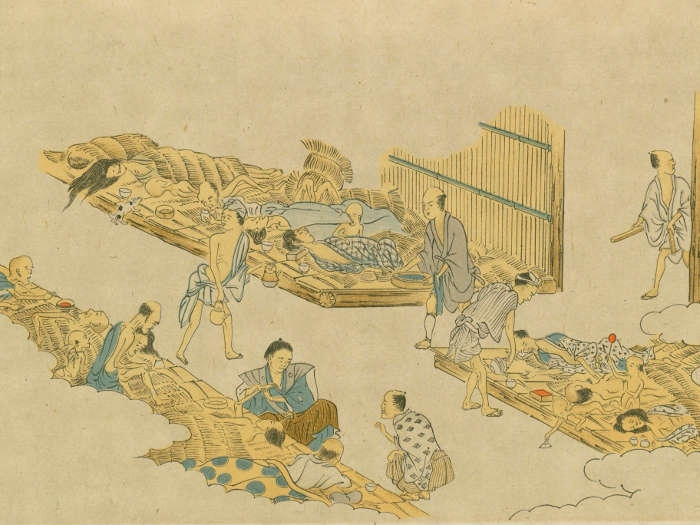
Tenpō famine

The Tenpō famine (天保の飢饉, Tenpō no kikin), also known as the Great Tenpō famine (天保の大飢饉, Tenpō no daikikin), was a famine that affected Japan during the Edo period. Considered to have lasted from 1833 to 1837, (Note: One source states that the famine ended in 1839.) it was named after the Tenpō era (1830–1844), during the reign of Emperor Ninkō. The death toll was estimated between 200,000 and 300,000. The ruling shōgun during the famine was Tokugawa Ienari.

The famine was most severe in northern Honshū and was caused by flooding and cold weather. The countryside experienced severe rains that drowned crops and unseasonable cold temperatures. In an effort to stem the effects of the famine, the northern domain of Hirosaki banned all exports of rice from 1833 to 1838 - nevertheless, the population of the city decreased by 80,000, more than half of which was from people fleeing the domain itself. The Tenpō famine increased the number of beggars throughout northern Japan, who were considered more lawless and unorderly than the beggars seen during the Tenmei famine in the 1780s. In 1837, the town elders of Ōno reported a sharp increase in theft, deterioration of public safety, extortion, and arson.

Between 1834 and 1840, only eight of Japan's 68 provinces reported a population increase; 27 provinces reported a population decline of 5% of more. The famine was one of a series of calamities that shook the faith of the people in the ruling bakufu. During the same period as the famine, there were also the Kōgo Fires of Edo (1834) and a 7.6 magnitude earthquake in the Sanriku region (1835). In the last year of the famine, Ōshio Heihachirō led a revolt in Osaka against corrupt officials who had refused to help feed the impoverished residents of the city. Another revolt sprung up in Chōshū Domain. Also in 1837, the American merchant vessel Morrison appeared off the coast of Shikoku and was driven away by coastal artillery. Those incidents made the Tokugawa bakufu look weak and powerless, and they exposed the corruption of the officials who profited while the commoners suffered.

== Causes ==
The famine was most severe in northern Honshū and was caused by flooding and cold weather. The countryside experienced severe rains that drowned crops and unseasonable cold temperatures. In an effort to stem the effects of the famine, the northern domain of Hirosaki banned all exports of rice from 1833 to 1838 - nevertheless, the population of the city decreased by 80,000, more than half of which was from people fleeing the domain itself.

The famine was further deepened by repeat insect infestations and outbreaks of disease. Although the Tenpō famine is considered one of the Four Great Famines of the Tokugawa period, the Japanese demographer Akira Hayami has proposed that the deaths and population decline from the years of the famine were actually caused by the disease outbreaks rather than the famine itself.

In 2025, scientists suggested that the famine may have been caused by climate disruptions from an 1831 eruption of the Zavaritski Caldera in Russia.

== Social effects ==
The Tenpō famine increased the number of beggars throughout northern Japan, who were considered more lawless and unorderly than the beggars seen during the Tenmei famine in the 1780s. In 1837, the town elders of Ōno reported a sharp increase in theft, deterioration of public safety, extortion, and arson. One town elder proposed expelling the entire cohort of vagrants but was vetoed by the town's governor who was worried that this might make the vagrants even more lawless. Beggar tags, which had been a common part of Tokugawa-era beggar control, were implemented in Ōno during the Tenpō famine. In 1838, the Echizen Domain began a system of issuing begging licenses, in the form of hip tags (腰札, koshifuda), to existing beggars and barring entry to new beggars from other domains.

== Consequences ==
Between 1834 and 1840, only eight of Japan's sixty-eight provinces reported a population increase; 27 provinces reported a population decline of 5% of more.

The famine was one of a series of calamities that shook the faith of the people in the ruling bakufu. During the same period as the famine, there were also the Kōgo Fires of Edo (1834) and a 7.6 magnitude earthquake in the Sanriku region (1835). In the last year of the famine, Ōshio Heihachirō led a revolt in Osaka against corrupt officials, who refused to help feed the impoverished residents of the city. Another revolt sprung up in Chōshū Domain. Also in 1837, the American merchant vessel Morrison appeared off the coast of Shikoku and was driven away by coastal artillery. Those incidents made the Tokugawa bakufu look weak and powerless, and they exposed the corruption of the officials who profited while the commoners suffered.

In the western half of Japan, the famine ended in 1836, while starvation continued into 1837 in the east.

=== Tenpō reforms ===
The nationwide Tenpō reforms were a variety of economic policies introduced after the end of the famine in 1841. However, domains across Japan had begun instituting their own reforms during the latter years of the famine. Mito Domain, under Tokugawa Nariaki, implemented four major reforms: a comprehensive land survey, resettlement of samurai to rural areas, the end of the domain's daimyo in Edo, and the establishment of a domain school.

== See also ==
- 1837 tsunami
- List of famines
- Kan'ei Great Famine
