= Kan'ei Great Famine =

17th century famine in Japan

The Kan'ei Great Famine (寛永の大飢饉 Kan'ei no daikikin) was a famine which affected Japan during the reign of Empress Meishō in the Edo period. The estimated number of deaths due to starvation is between 50,000 and 100,000. The famine is generally considered to have begun in 1640 and lasted into 1643. It was named after the Kan'ei era (1624–1644). The ruling shōgun during the famine was Tokugawa Iemitsu.

== Events leading to the famine ==
Due to large numbers of internally displaced persons in the aftermath of the Shimabara Rebellion, and the rinderpest epizooty, which broke out in Kyushu in 1638 and was impossible to contain, led to mass deaths of cattle in Western Japan, which reduced agricultural productivity in 1640 due to the scarcity of working animals. Also, motivation among farmers was weakening due to the extreme impoverishment of low-ranking samurai class members. The increased spending after the 1635 reformation of Sankin-kōtai (increasing frequency of daimyō annual trips to Edo) did not help either. The diversion of labour to the completion of the Tōkaidō highway and economical disturbances caused by abortive monetary reforms in 1641 further reduced the margin of agricultural productivity, making famine inevitable.

== Events during the famine ==
The eruption of Hokkaido Koma-ga-take in June 1640, resulting in heavy ashfall and plants poisoning in Tsugaru Peninsula and nearby areas, triggered local crop failures which continued into 1642. Early 1641 had already seen a high number of abnormal weather events in East Asia. In Japan, drought hit the Kinai and Chūgoku regions as well as the island of Shikoku. Cold winds and heavy rains afflicted the Hokuriku region. Elsewhere, the abnormal patterns of heavy rain, flooding, drought, frost (in particular, frost hit in Akita in August) and insect damage sent food reserves plummeting toward zero. Overall, the heaviest crop failures occurred in the Tōhoku region in areas facing the Sea of Japan.

By June 1642, starving peasants had started to either flee or sell their lots en masse, which alerted the shogunate to the scale of the famine. The shogunate reacted by ordering the re-planting of tobacco plantations with food crops, restricting alcohol production (no new breweries, suspension of production of rural breweries, and halving production of urban and highway breweries), and prohibiting land lot sales. Also, the manufacture and sale of non-essential food products, such as millet udon, wheat flour, sōmen, manjū, confections, and soba, was prohibited. Improvements to the rice distribution system and the recall of rice-retaining daimyō to Edo were also put into practice, along with emergency food distribution sheds. Despite the government's and clans' best efforts, however, the number of people dying from hunger steadily increased during the 1642-1643 winter. The large displacement of people resulted in wild population fluctuations in Edo and three other major cities of Japan, as crowds searched for the places where starvation was least likely.

One of the most heavily afflicted areas was Aizu in what is now Fukushima Prefecture, where local farmers performed infanticide on all children below 7 years and lent older children as slaves, often to pimps. Due to high interest rates, this lending frequently turned into permanent slavery. Should the child slave escape, the peasant parents were obliged to repay a double amount of gold or to provide another slave. In one village of 127 persons, 60 were sold into slavery in the span of four years (even if sellers were not paid), because becoming a slave was the only option to escaping starvation.

According to the Fukuza Monogatari (福斉物語)", the situation in Kyoto was particularly awful. The usual stove smoke at dawn and dusk disappeared, people were wandering in gang-like formations, dead bodies were piled on the streets, and infants were abandoned under eaves to starve to death or be devoured by dogs. In Nakatsugawa, Gifu, 90 out of a population of 700 died of starvation during the Kan'ei Great Famine.

With the crop yield in 1643 closer to average, the famine gradually ended.

== Aftermath of the famine ==
The Bakufu government used the practices learned during the Kan'ei Great Famine for the management of the later famines, most notably during the Tenpō famine in 1833. Also, together with the expulsion of Christianity from Japan, the Kan'ei Great Famine set a template for how the Bakufu would address country-wide problems, bypassing daimyō. The governing structures of several clans were streamlined. Finally, greater protection of peasants from arbitrary taxes of local lords was implemented.

== See also ==
- List of famines
- Tenpō famine

== Notes and references ==
This article incorporates material from the article 寛永の大飢饉 in the Japanese Wikipedia, retrieved on 28 June 2017.
