= List of droughts =

This is a list of significant droughts, organized by large geographical area and then year.

== Africa ==
- Aoyate drought in the late 18th or early 19th century
- 1983–1985 famine in Ethiopia
- 2008–2009 Kenya drought
- 2011 East Africa drought
- Sahel drought
  - 2010 Sahel famine
  - 2012 Sahel drought
- Eastern Cape drought
- 2017 Somali drought
- 2018–2021 Southern African drought
- 2020–2023 Horn of Africa drought
- 2021 Somali drought
- Food security in Malawi
- 2024 Namibia drought

== The Americas ==
=== Caribbean ===
- 2015 Caribbean drought

=== South America ===
- Drought in Chile
  - Great Drought of 1968 (1967–1969)
  - Chilean water crisis (2010–present)
    - Petorca water crisis (2010–present)
- Drought in Uruguay (2020–present)
  - 2022-2023 Uruguay drought
- Drought in Brazil
  - Drought in Northeastern Brazil
  - Grande Seca (1877–78)
  - 2014–2017 Brazilian drought
- 2023–2024 South American drought

=== United States ===
- 1935 Black Sunday (storm)
- 1934–35 North American drought
- 1950s Texas drought
- 1983–1985 North American drought
- 1988–1990 North American drought
- 2002 North American drought
- 2006–2008 Southeastern United States drought
- 2010–2013 Southern United States and Mexico drought
  - 2012–2013 North American drought
- 2011–2017 California drought
- 2012–2013 North American drought
- 2020–2023 North American drought

== Asia ==
=== China ===
- 1875 Drought and subsequent famine
- 2010 China drought and dust storms
- 2010–2011 China drought

=== India ===
- Deccan famine of 1630–1632
- Great Bengal famine of 1770
- Chalisa famine
- Doji bara famine
- Guntur famine of 1832
- Agra famine of 1837–1838
- Upper Doab famine of 1860–1861
- Orissa famine of 1866
- Rajputana famine of 1869
- Bihar famine of 1873–1874
- Great Famine of 1876–1878
- Tamil Nadu famine (1891)
- Indian famine of 1896–1897
- Indian famine of 1899–1900
- Bengal famine of 1943
- Bihar drought of 1966–1967
- 2013 drought in Maharashtra
- 2016–2017 Drought in Tamil Nadu

=== Iran ===
- 2025 Iranian water crises

=== Syria ===
- 2025 hunger crisis in Syria

=== Turkey ===
- 2025 Turkey water crisis

== Europe ==
- 1473 heat and drought in Europe
- 1540 European drought
- Russian famine of 1891–1892
- Soviet famine of 1946–1947
- 2022 European drought
- 2023 European drought
- 2026 European drought

=== United Kingdom ===
- 1906 UK Drought and Heatwave
- 1911 UK Drought and Heatwave
- 1935 UK Drought and Heatwave
- 1955 UK Drought and Heatwave
- 1976 UK Drought and Heatwave
- 1990 UK Drought and Heatwave
- 1995 UK Drought and Heatwave (The drought generally lasted until Summer 1997)
- 2003 UK Drought and Heatwave
- 2006 UK Drought and Heatwave
- 2011 UK Drought and March–April Heatwave (The drought continued from 2010 and lasted through until March 2012)

Part of the 2010–2012 UK Drought. 2011 UK September–October Heatwave Part of the 2010–2012 UK Drought. 2012 UK March Heatwave

== Oceania ==
=== Australia ===
- Drought in Australia
- Federation Drought (1901)
- 1911–1916 Australian drought
- 1979–1983 Eastern Australian drought
- 2000s Australian drought

=== South Pacific ===
- 2011 Tuvalu drought
