= Timeline of major famines in India during British rule =

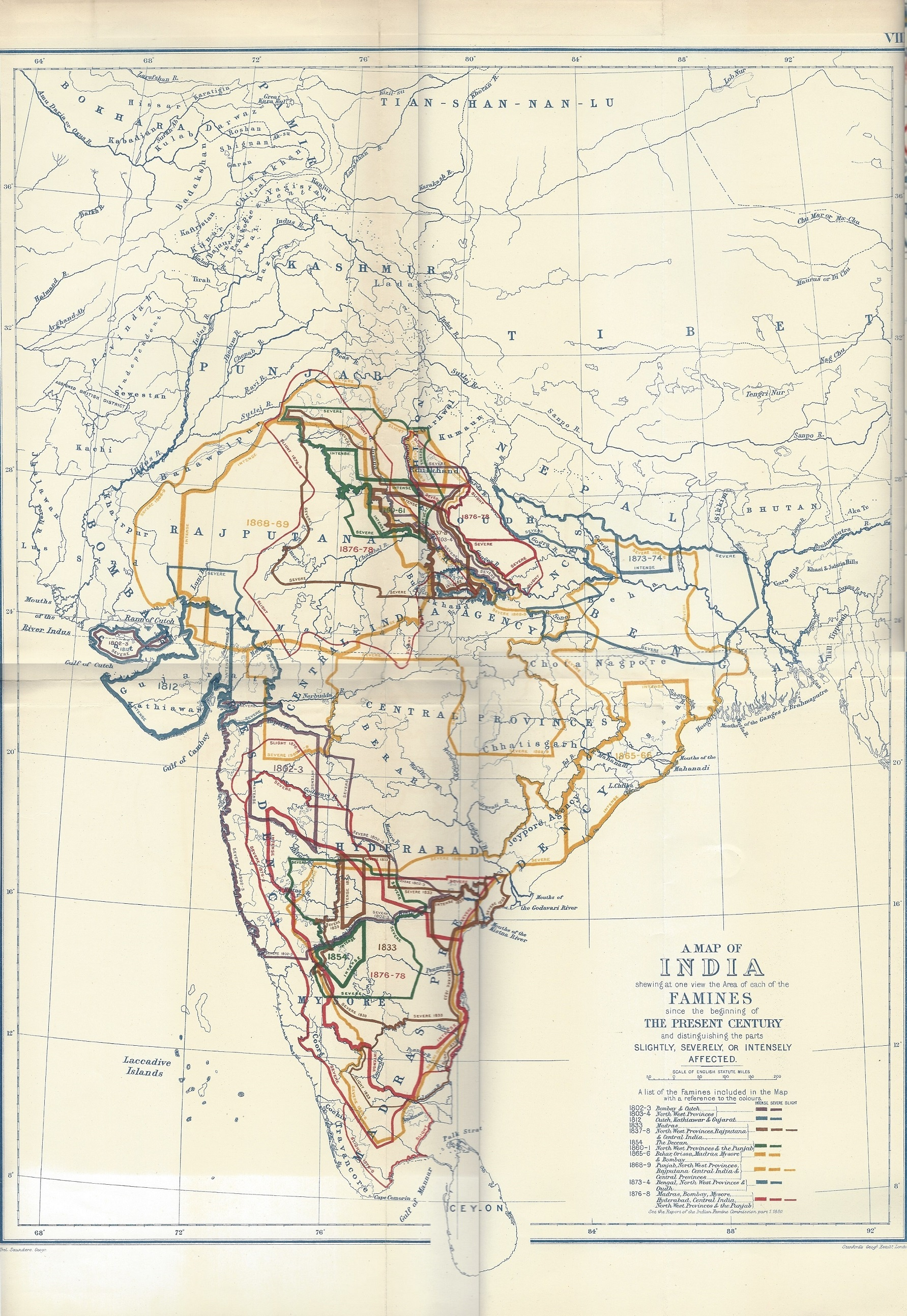
- Map of famines in India between 1800 and 1878
- Country: Company rule in India, British Raj
- Period: 1765–1947

The timeline of major famines in India during British rule covers major famines on the Indian subcontinent from 1765 to 1947. The famines included here occurred both in British India (regions administered either by the British East India Company from 1765 to 1857, or by the British Crown, in the British Raj, from 1858 to 1947) and the princely states (regions administered by Indian rulers under British paramountcy).

The year 1765 is chosen as the start year because that year the British East India Company, after its victory in the Battle of Buxar, was granted the Diwani (rights to land revenue) in the region of Bengal (although it would not directly administer Bengal until 1784, when it was granted the Nizamat, or control of law and order.) In 1947, the British Raj was dissolved and the successor states of Dominion of India and Dominion of Pakistan were established. The eastern half of the Dominion of Pakistan would become the People's Republic of Bangladesh in 1971.

A "major famine" is defined by a magnitude scale, an end-to-end assessment based on total excess death. According to it: (a) a minor famine is accompanied by less than 999 excess deaths); (b) a moderate famine by between 1,000 and 9,999 excess deaths; (c) a major famine by between 10,000 and 99,999 excess deaths; (d) a great famine by between 100,000 and 999,999 excess deaths; and (e) a catastrophic famine by more than 1 million excess deaths.

The British era is significant because many famines struck India during this period. There is a vast literature on the famines in colonial British India. The mortality in these famines was excessively high and in some may have been increased by British policies. The mortality in the Great Bengal famine of 1770 was between one and 10 million; the Chalisa famine of 1783–1784, 11 million; Doji bara famine of 1791–1792, 11 million; and Agra famine of 1837–1838, 800,000. In the second half of the 19th-century large-scale excess mortality was caused by: Upper Doab famine of 1860–1861, 2 million; Great Famine of 1876–1878, 5.5 million; Indian famine of 1896–1897, 5 million; and Indian famine of 1899–1900, 1 million. The first major famine of the 20th century was the Bengal famine of 1943, which affected the Bengal region during wartime; it was one of the major South Asian famines in which anywhere between 1.5 million and 3 million people died.

The era is significant also because it is the first period for which there is systematic documentation. Major reports, such as the Report on the Upper Doab famine of 1860–1861 by Richard Baird Smith, those of the Indian Famine Commissions of 1880, 1897, and 1901 and the Famine Inquiry Commission of 1944, appeared during this period, as did the Indian Famine Codes. These last, consolidating in the 1880s, were the first carefully considered system for the prediction of famine and the pre-emptive mitigation of its impact; the codes were to affect famine relief well into the 1970s. The Bengal famine of 1943, the last major famine of British India occurred in part because the authorities failed to take notice of the famine codes in wartime conditions. The indignation caused by this famine accelerated the decolonization of British India. It also impelled Indian nationalists to make food security an important post-independence goal. After independence, the Dominion of India and thereafter the Republic of India inherited these codes, which were modernized and improved, and although there were severe food shortages in India after independence, and malnutrition continues to the present day, there were neither serious famines, nor clear and undisputed or large-scale ones. The economist Amartya Sen who won the 1998 Nobel Memorial Prize in Economic Sciences in part for his work on the economic mechanisms underlying famines, has stated in his 2009 book, The Idea of Justice:

Though Indian democracy has many imperfections, nevertheless the political incentives generated by it have been adequate to eliminate major famines right from the time of independence. The last substantial famine in India — the Bengal famine — occurred only four years before the Empire ended. The prevalence of famines, which had been a persistent feature of the long history of the British Indian Empire, ended abruptly with the establishment of a democracy after independence.

Migration of indentured labourers from India to the British tropical colonies of Mauritius, Fiji, Trinidad and Tobago, Surinam, Natal and British Guyana has been correlated to a large number of these famines. The first famine of the British period, the Great Bengal famine of 1770, appears in work of the Bengali language novelist Bankim Chandra Chatterjee; the last famine of the British period, Bengal famine of 1943 appears in the work of the Indian film director, Satyajit Ray. The inadequate official response to the Great Famine of 1876–1878, led Allan Octavian Hume and William Wedderburn in 1883 to found the Indian National Congress, the first nationalist movement in the British Empire in Asia and Africa. Upon assumption of its leadership by Mahatma Gandhi in 1920, Congress was to secure India both independence and reconciliation.

== Timeline ==
Chronological list of famines in India between 1765 and 1947
Year	Name of famine (if any)	British territory	Indian kingdoms/Princely states	Mortality	Map or illustration
1769–1770	Great Bengal Famine	Bihar, Western Bengal		2–10 million	The Bengal region shown in a later map (1880)
1783–1784	Chalisa famine		Delhi, Western Oudh, Eastern Punjab region, Rajputana, and Kashmir	11 million people may have died during the years 1782–1784. Severe famine. Large areas were depopulated.	Oudh, the Doab (land between the Ganges and Jumna rivers), Rohilkhand, the Delhi territories, eastern Punjab, Rajputana and Kashmir, were affected by the Chalisa famine.
1791–1792	Doji bara famine or Skull famine	Madras Presidency	Hyderabad, Southern Maratha country, Deccan, Gujarat, and Marwar	11 million perished during the years 1788–1794. One of the most severe famines known. People died in such numbers that they could not be cremated or buried.	Map of India (1795) shows the Northern Circars, Hyderabad (Nizam), Southern Maratha Kingdom, Gujarat, and Marwar (Southern Rajputana), all affected by the Doji bara famine.
1837–1838	Agra famine of 1837–1838	Central Doab and trans-Jumna districts of the North-Western Provinces (later Agra Province), including Delhi and Hissar		0.8 million (or 800,000).	Map of the North-Western Provinces showing the region severely afflicted by the famine (in blue)
1860–1861	Upper Doab famine of 1860–1861	Upper Doab of Agra; Delhi and Hissar divisions of the Punjab	Eastern Rajputana	2 million.	A map showing the Doab region
1865–1867	Orissa famine of 1866	Orissa (also 1867) and Bihar; Bellary and Ganjam districts of Madras		1 million (Orissa) and approximately 4–5 million in the entire region.	A 1907 map of Orissa, now Odisha, shown as the southwestern region of Greater Bengal. Coastal Balasore district was one of the worst-hit areas in the Odisha famine of 1866.
1868–1870	Rajputana famine of 1869	Ajmer, Western Agra, Eastern Punjab	Rajputana	1.5 million (mostly in the princely states of Rajputana).	Map of Rajputana consisting of the princely states of the Rajputana Agency and the British territory of Ajmer-Merwara, in 1909; the map was little changed since the year of the famine, 1869.
1873–1874	Bihar famine of 1873–1874	Bihar		Because of an extensive relief effort organized by the Bengal government, there were little to no significant mortalities during the famine.	A 1907 map of Bihar, British India, shown as the northern region of Greater Bengal. Monghyr district (top middle) was one of the worst-hit areas in the Bihar famine of 1873–74.
1876–1878	Great Famine of 1876–1878 (also Southern India famine of 1876–1878)	Madras and Bombay	Mysore and Hyderabad	5.5 million in British territory. Mortality unknown for princely states. Total famine mortality estimates vary from 6.1 to 10.3 million	Map of the British Indian Empire (1880), showing where the famine struck. Both years: Madras, Mysore, Hyderabad, and Bombay); during the second year: Central Provinces and the North-Western Provinces, and a small area in the Punjab
1896–1897	Indian famine of 1896–1897	Madras, Bombay Deccan, Bengal, United Provinces, Central Provinces. Also parts of Punjab specially Bagar tract.	Northern and eastern Rajputana, parts of Central India and Hyderabad	5 million (1 million in British territory (Note: According to a 1901 estimate published in The Lancet, this and other famines in India between 1891 and 1901 caused 19,000,000 deaths from "starvation or to the diseases arising therefrom", an estimate criticised by the writer and retired Indian Civil Servant Charles McMinn.)). 12–16 Million (in British Territories according to contemporary Western journalist accounts).	Map from Chicago Sunday Tribune, January 31, 1897, showing the areas in India affected by the famine.
1899–1900	Indian famine of 1899–1900	Bombay, Central Provinces, Berar, Ajmer. Also parts of Punjab specially Bagar tract.	Hyderabad, Rajputana, Central India, Baroda, Kathiawar, Cutch,	1 to 4.5 million (in British territories). Mortality unknown for princely states. Estimated to be 3 to 10 million (in British territories according to contemporary scholars and economists)	Map of Indian famine of 1899–1900 from Prosperous British India by William Digby
1943–1944	Bengal famine of 1943	Bengal		1.5 million from starvation; 2.1 to 3 million including deaths from epidemics.	A map of the districts of Bengal, 1943, from Famine Enquiry Commission, Report on Bengal, 1945

== Gallery ==
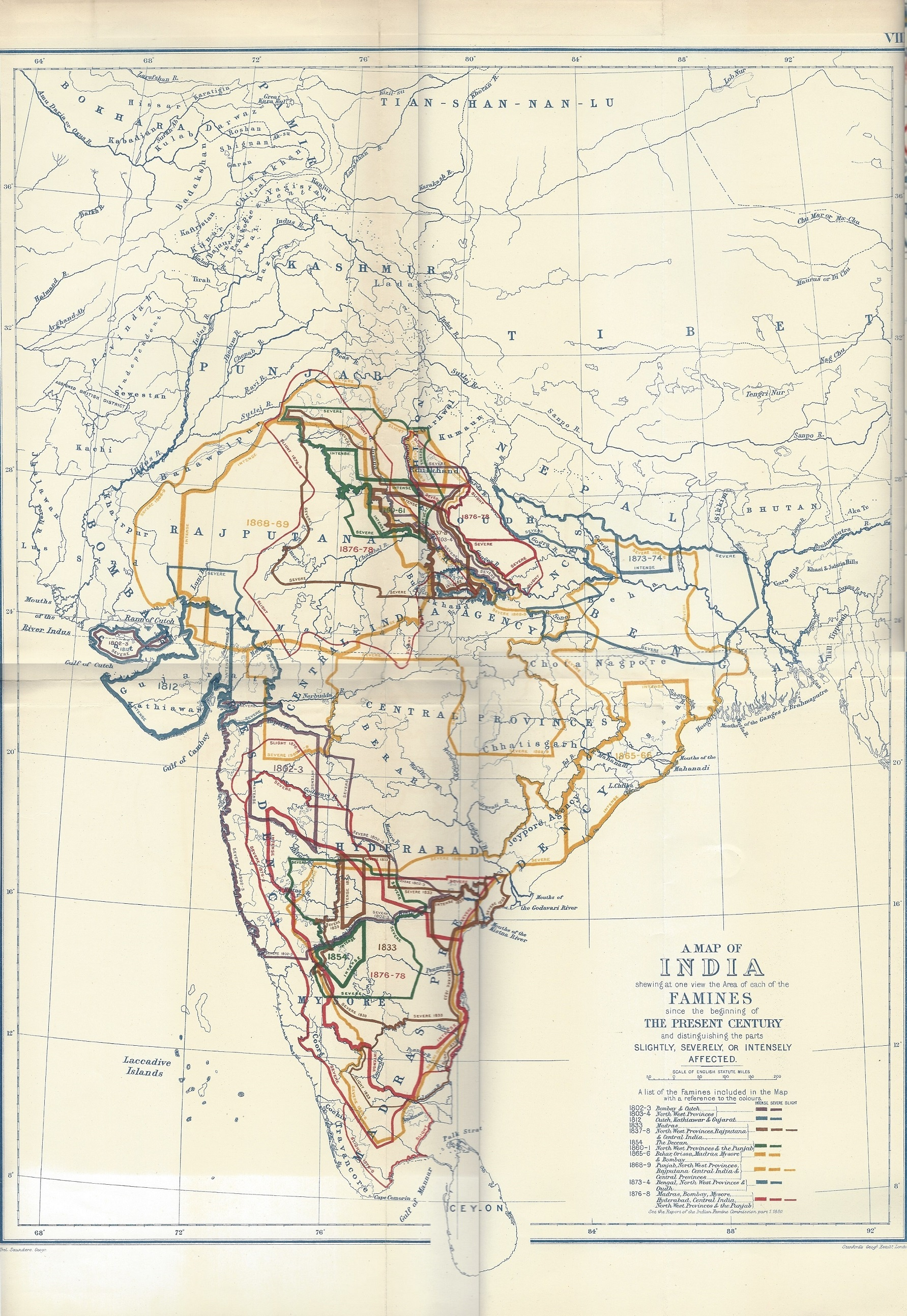
Map of famines in India between 1800 and 1878

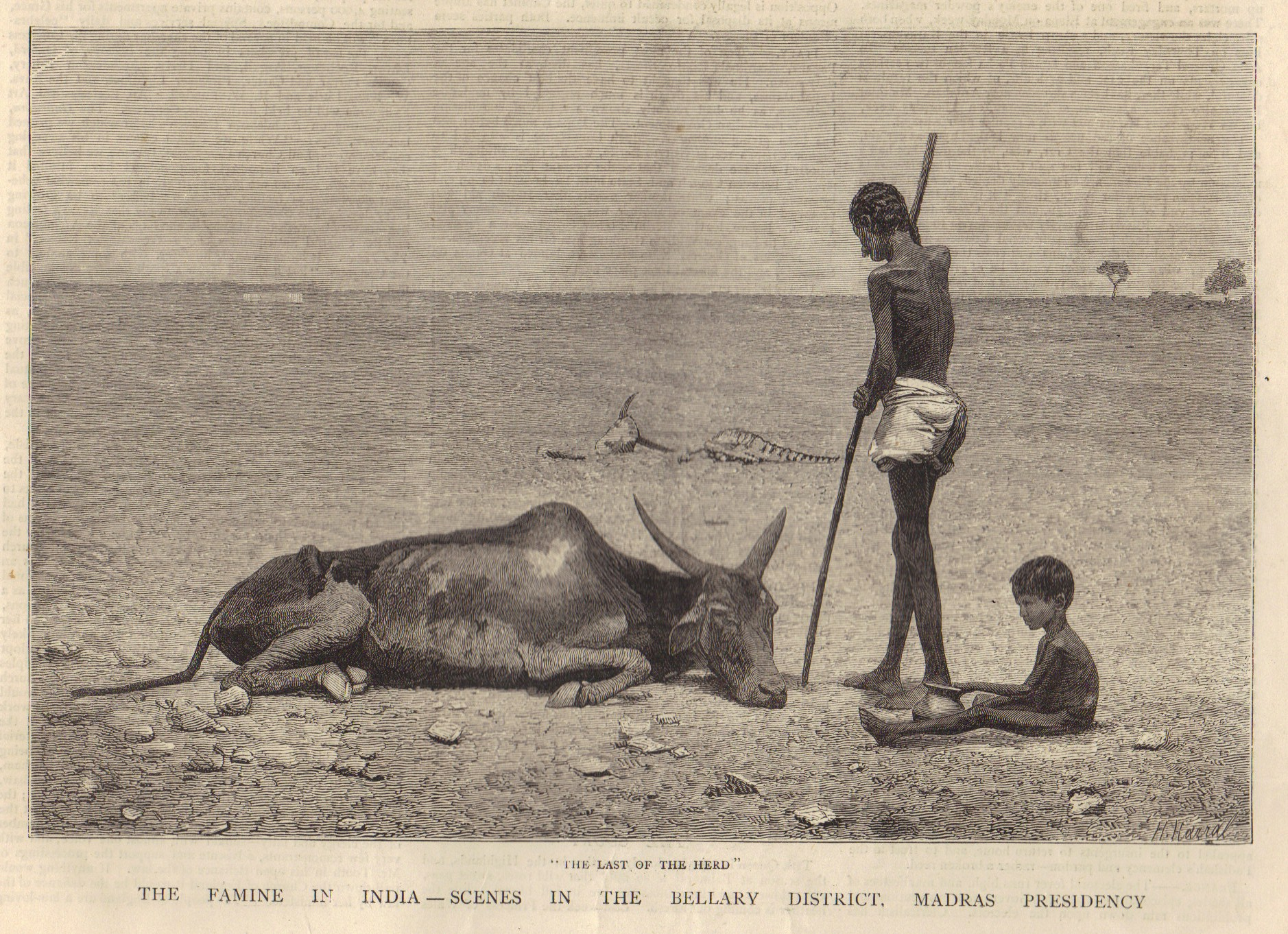
Engraving from The Graphic, October 1877, showing the plight of animals as well as humans in Bellary district, Madras Presidency, British India during the Great Famine of 1876–1878

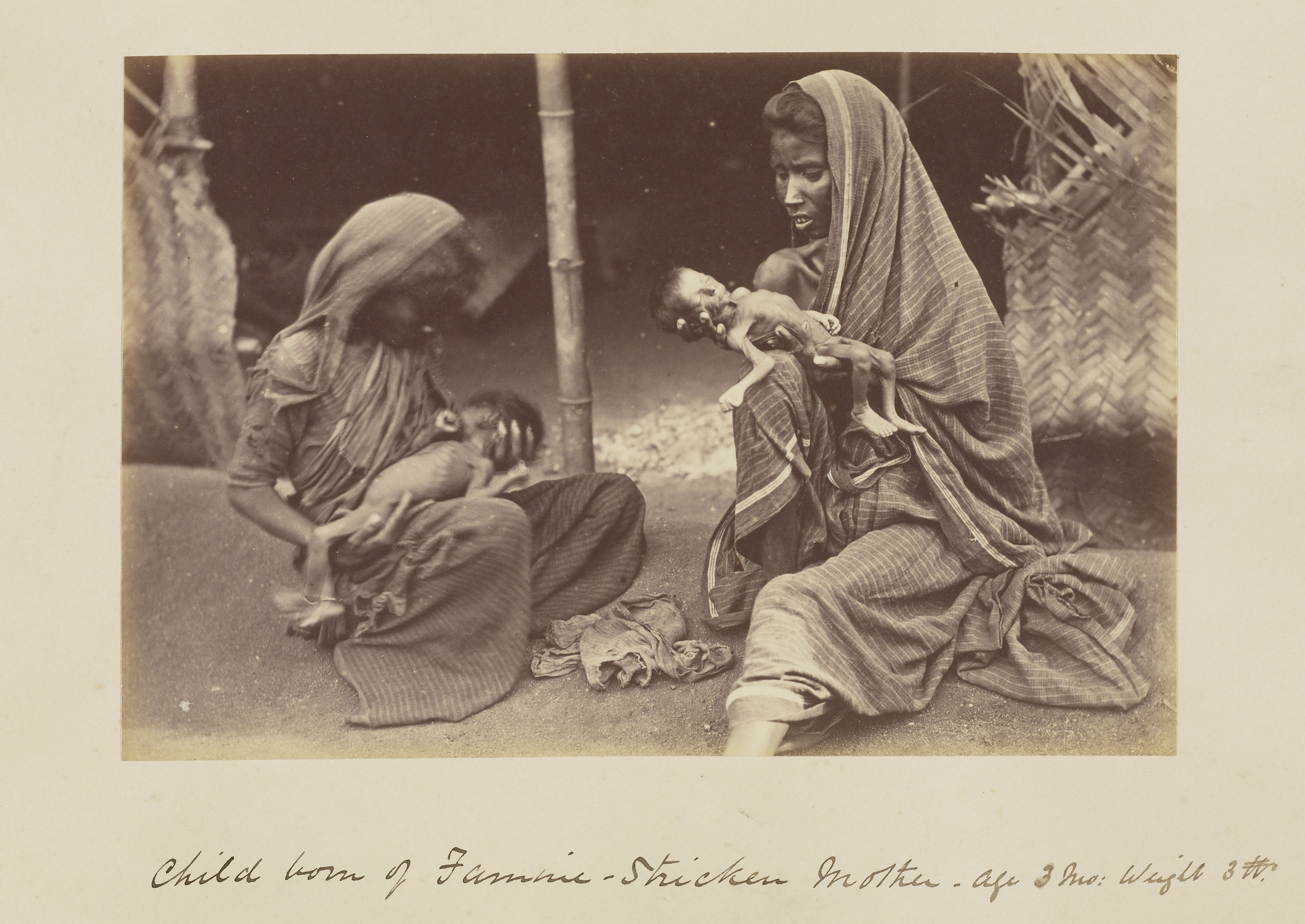
A photograph of a famine-stricken mother with a baby who at 3 months weighs 3 pounds. Photographer: W. W. Hooper. Great Famine of 1876–1878.

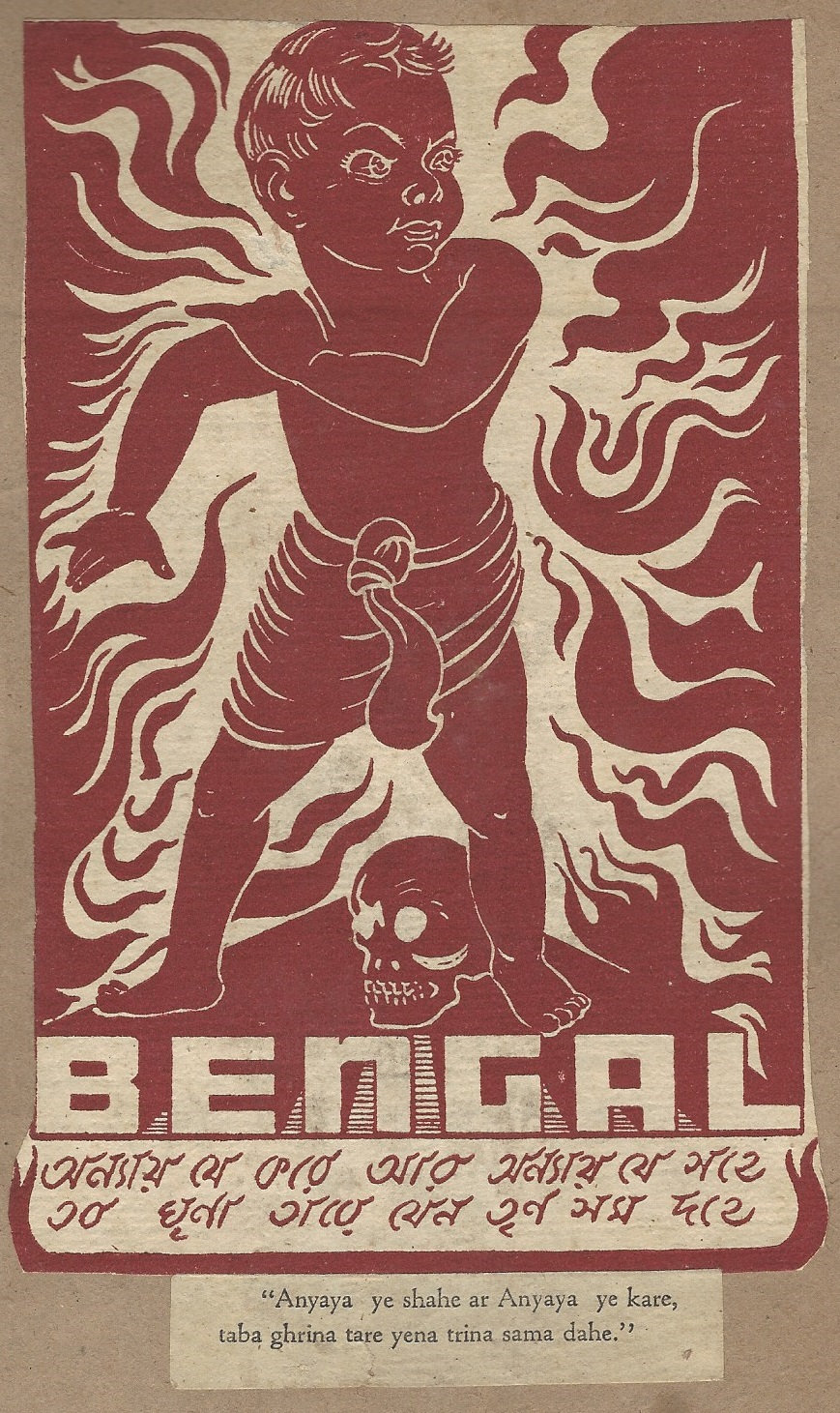
A poster envisioning the future of Bengal after the Bengal famine of 1943

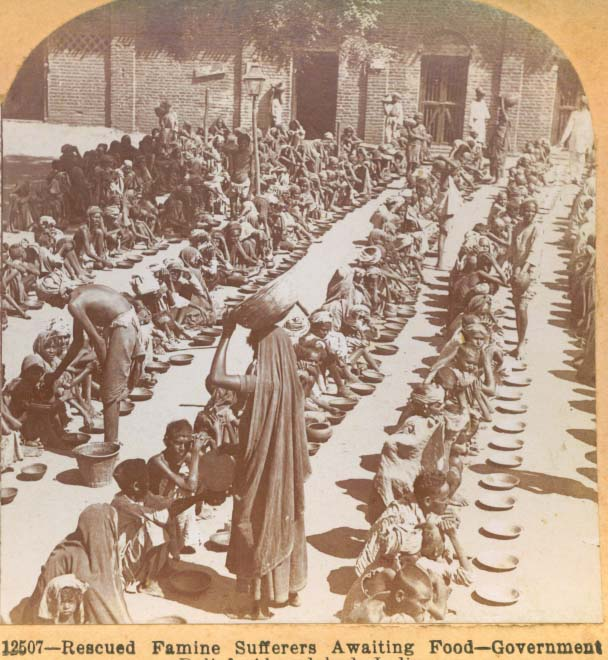
Government famine relief Ahmedabad, c. 1901

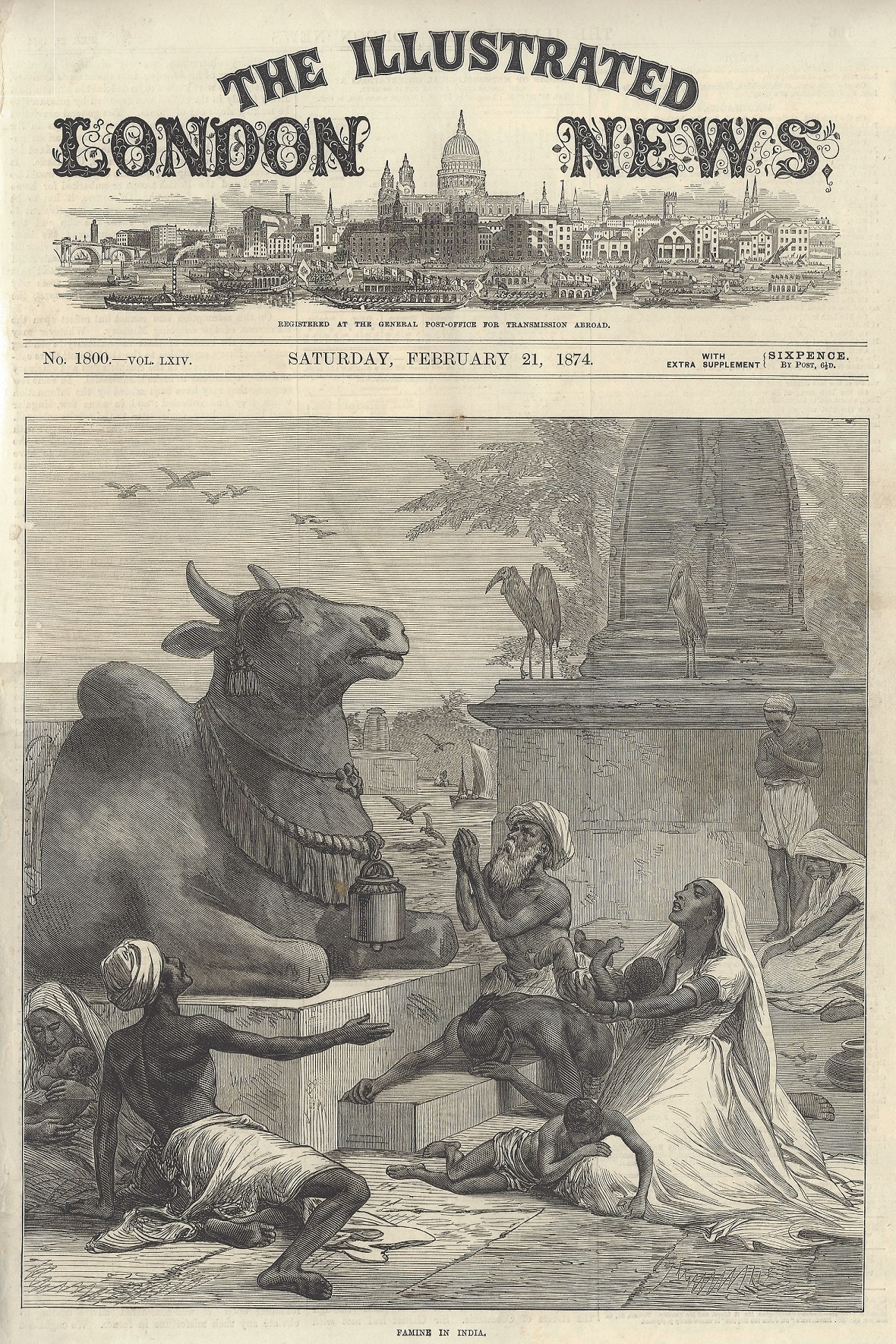
"Famine in India" front cover of Illustrated London News, February 21, 1874

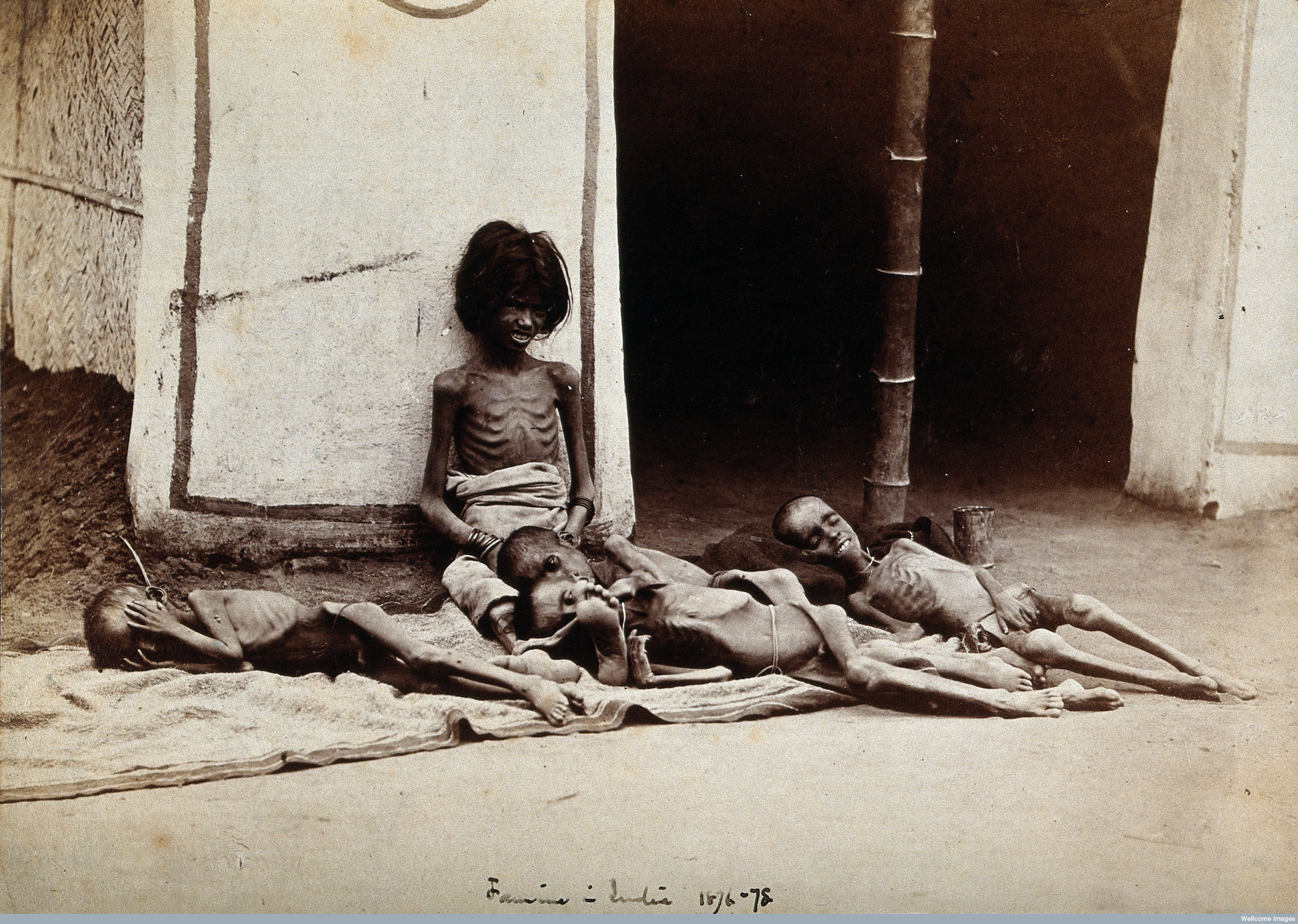
Five emaciated children during the famine of 1876–1878, India. Photographer: W. W. Hooper.

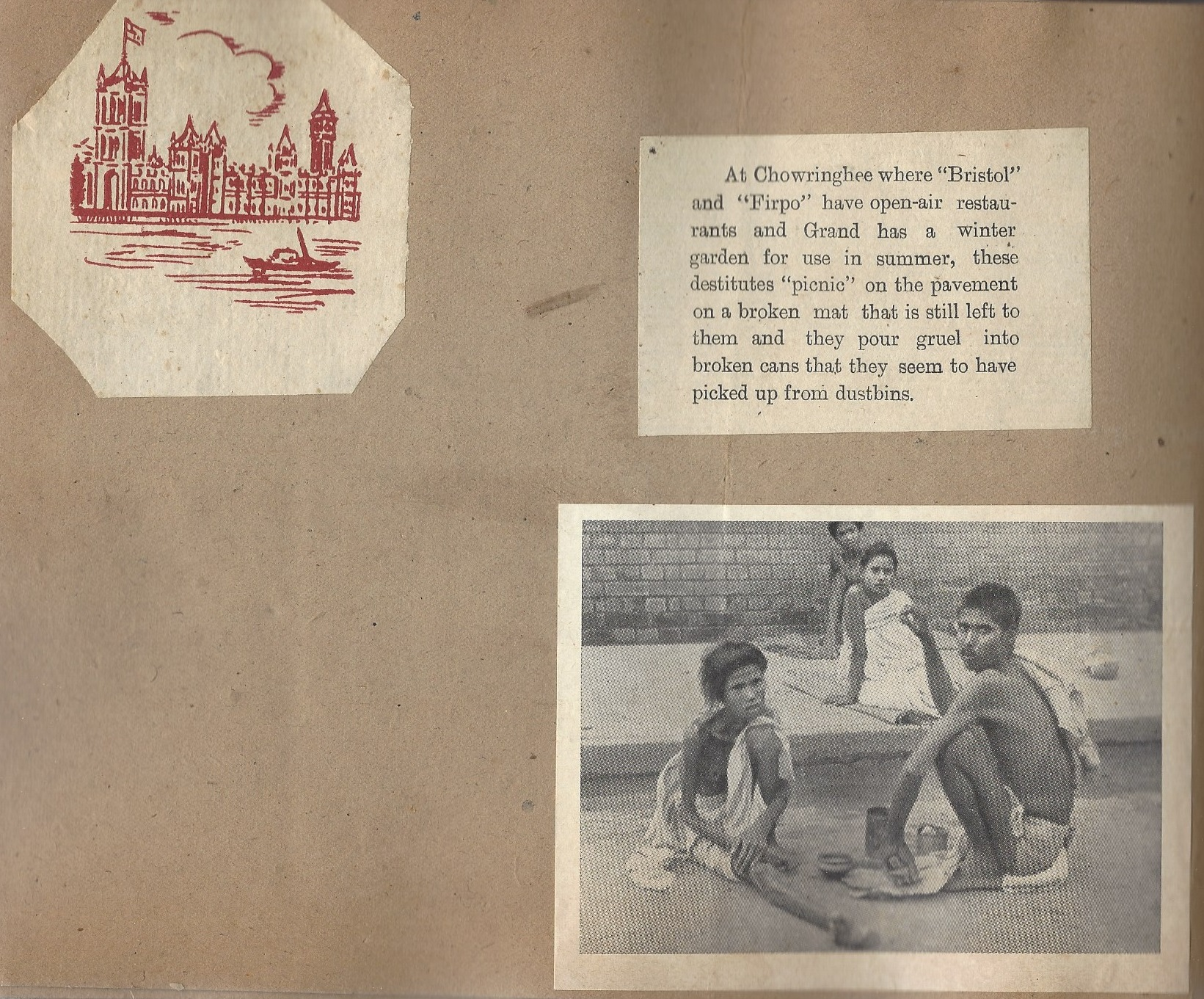
An illustration from Bengal Speaks (1944) showing homeless people eating on the sidewalk during the Bengal famine of 1943

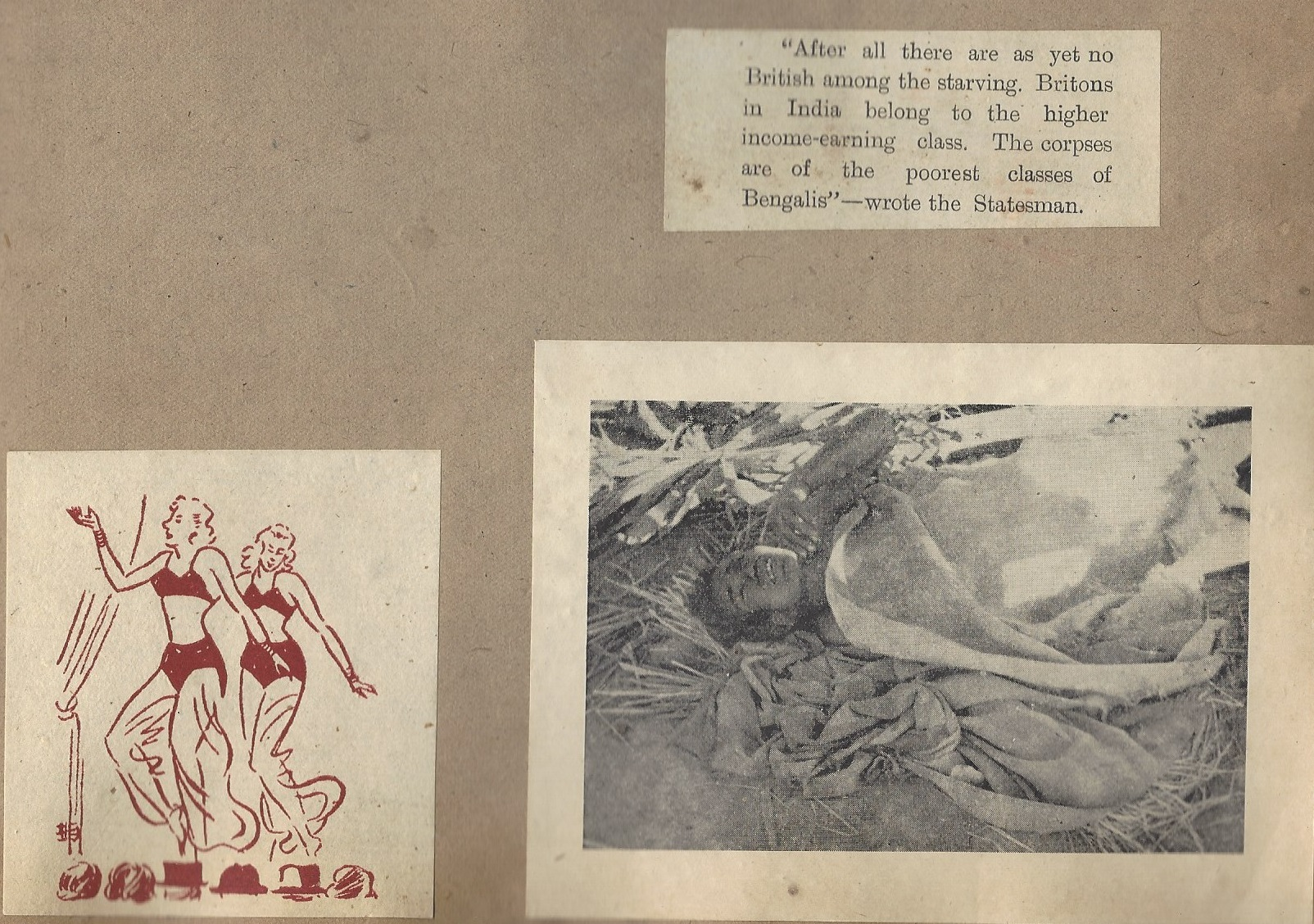
Illustration from Bengal Speaks (1944) showing a starvation fatality in the Bengal famine of 1943

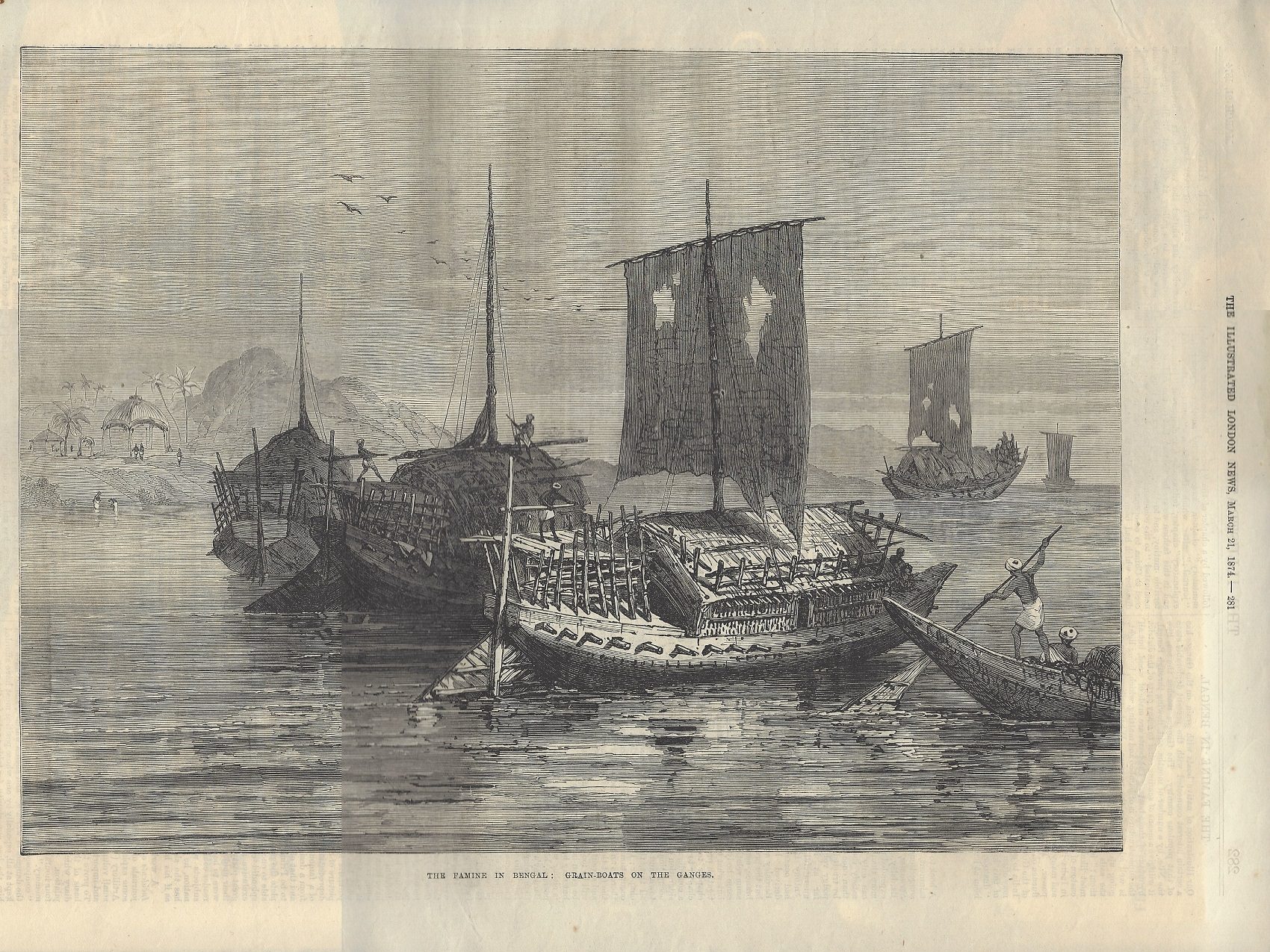
Famine in Bengal: Grain-boats on the Ganges. Illustrated London News, March 21, 1874.

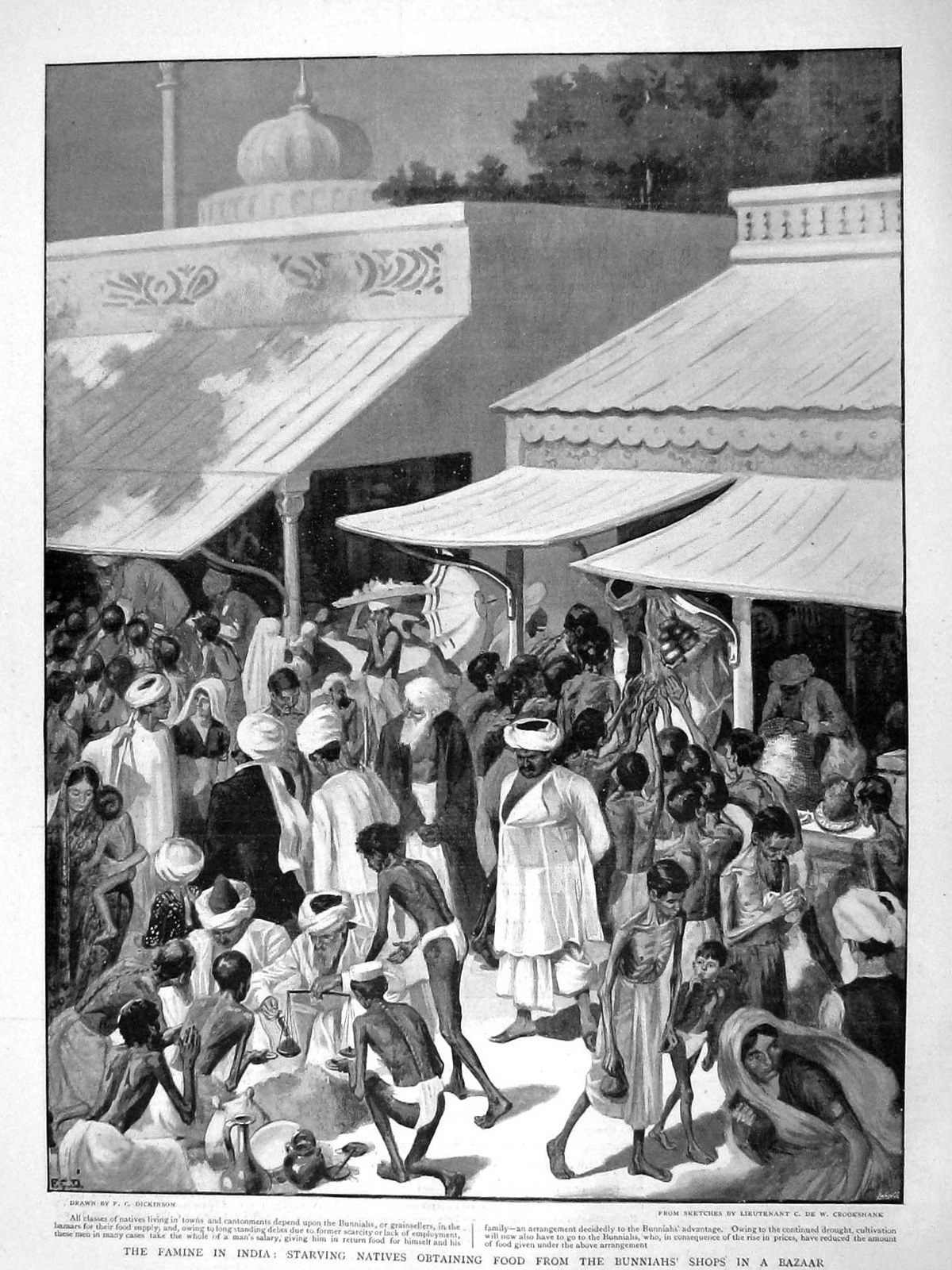
Drawing, titled "Famine in India," from The Graphic, February 27, 1897, showing a bazaar scene in India with shoppers, many of whom are emaciated, buying grain from a merchant's shop

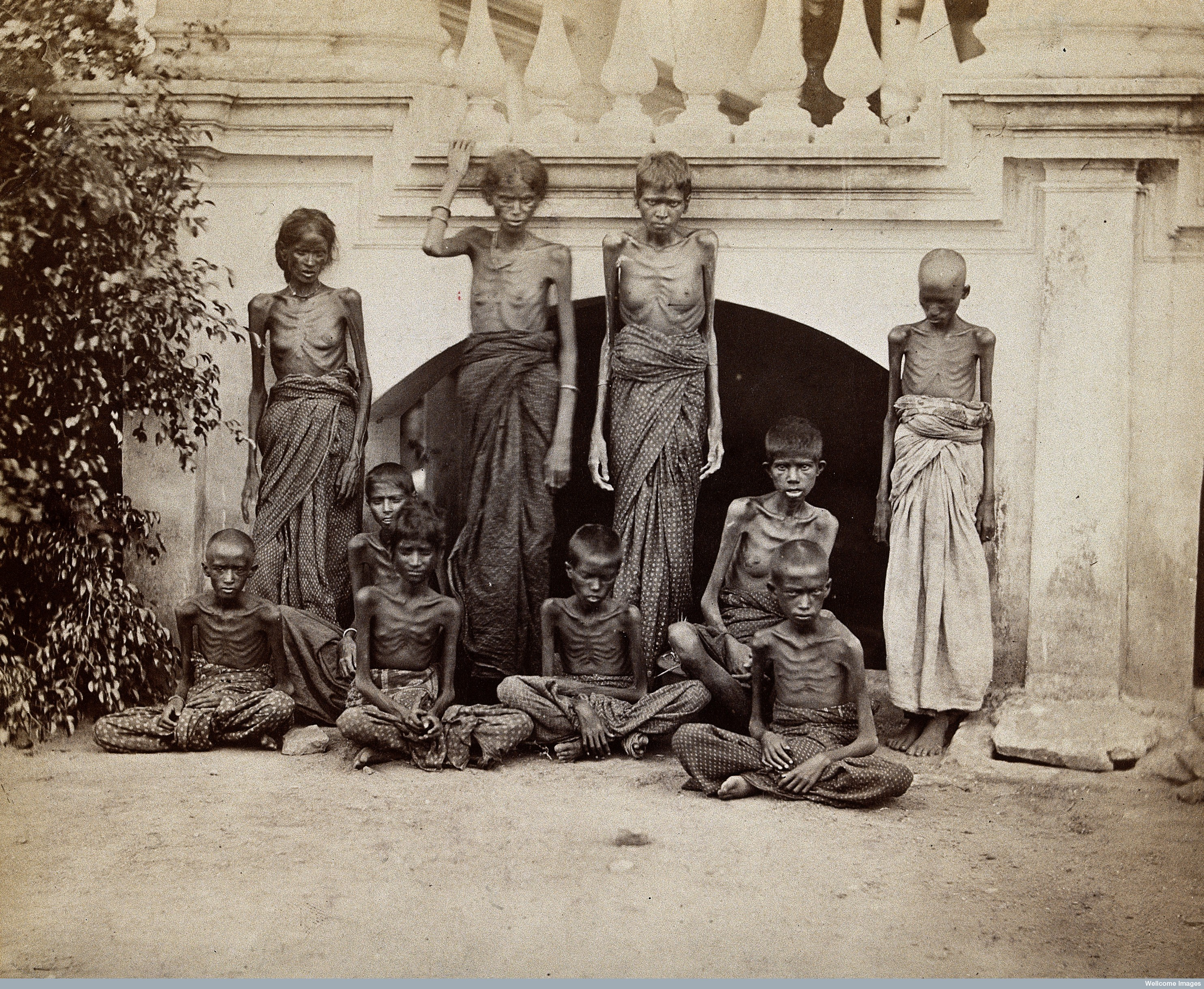
A group of emaciated women and children in Bangalore, India, famine of 1876–1878. Photographer: WW Hooper.

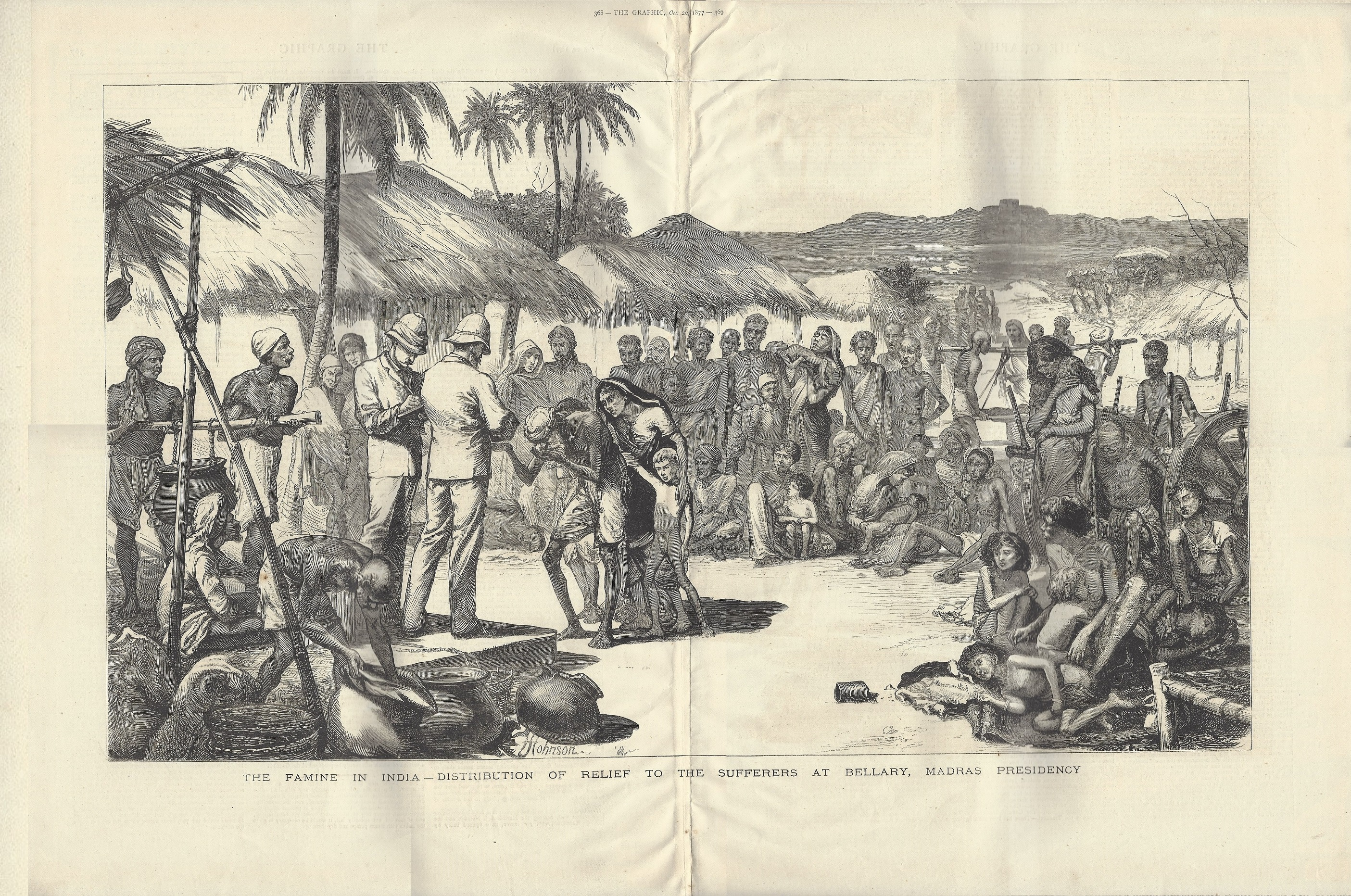
Famine relief at Bellary, Madras Presidency, The Graphic, October 1877

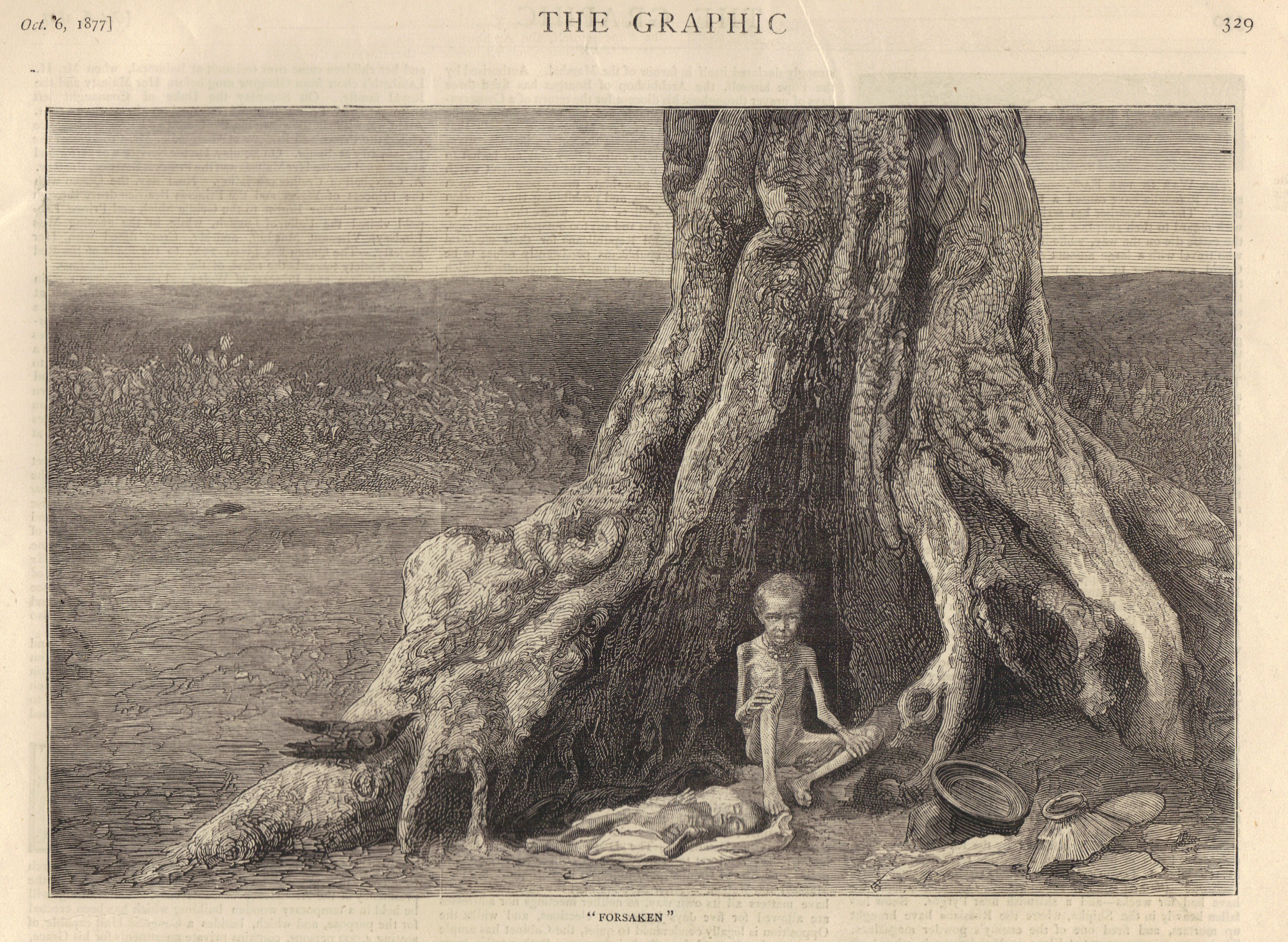
Engraving from The Graphic, October 1877, showing two forsaken children in the Bellary district of the Madras Presidency during the famine

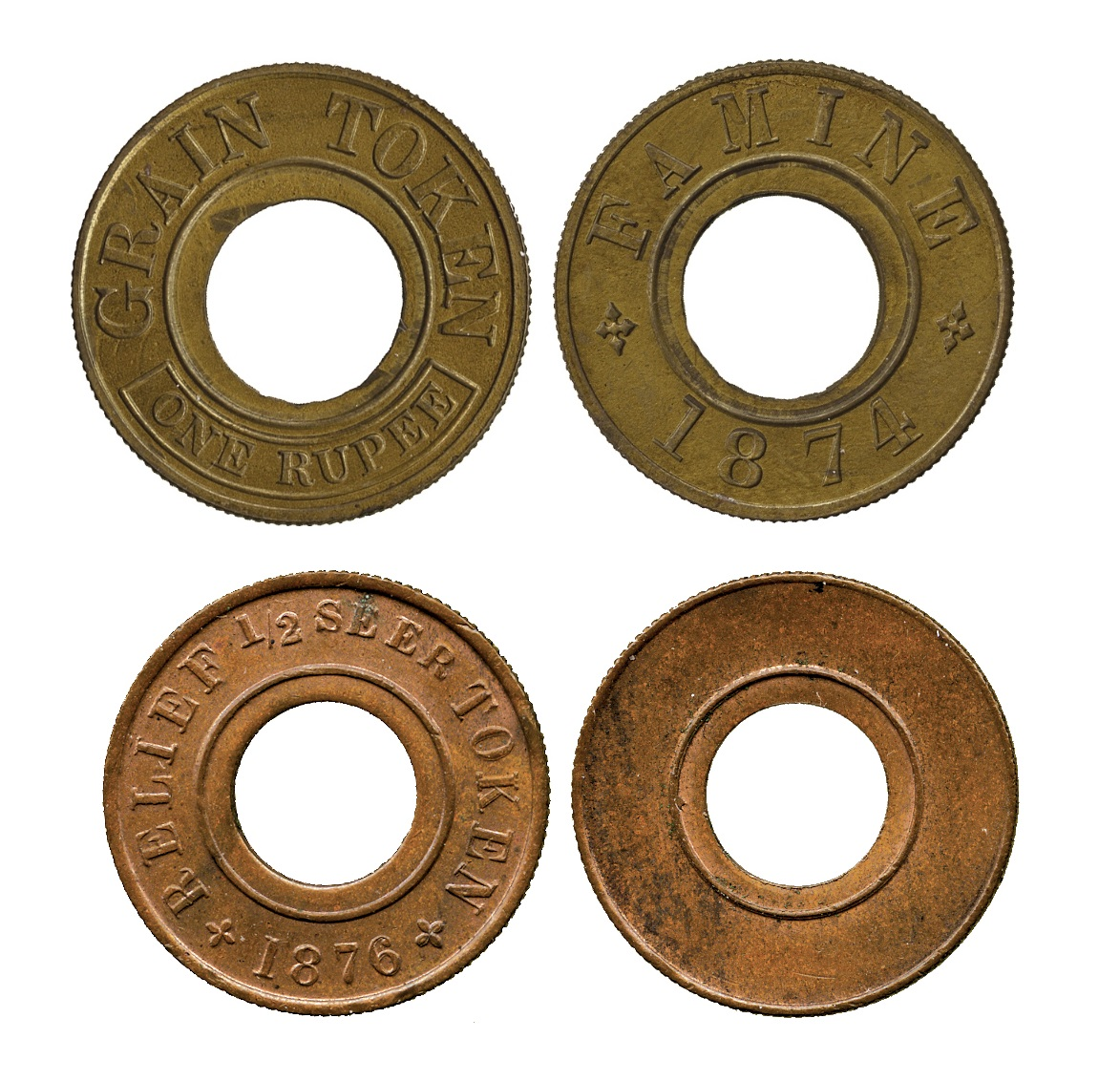
Famine tokens of 1874 Bihar famine, and the 1876 Great famine

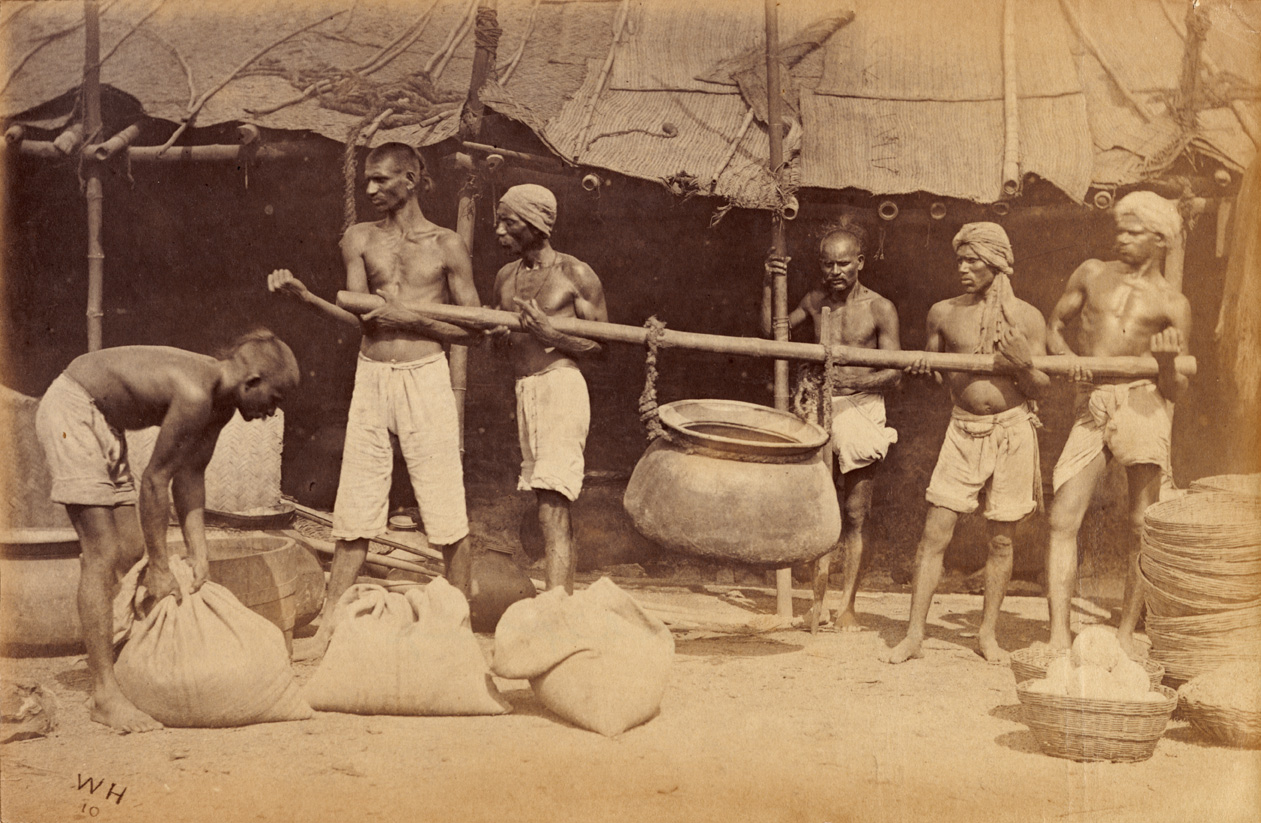
The "Cooks' Room" at a famine relief camp, Madras Presidency, 1876–1878. Photographer: W. W. Hooper.

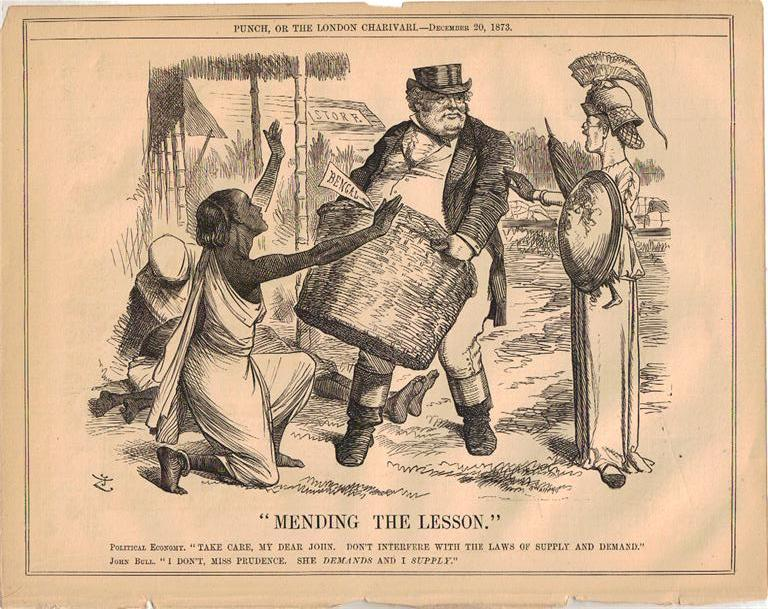
Cartoon from Punch, "Mending the Lesson" showing Miss Prudence warning John Bull about handing out too much charity to the needy during the Bihar famine of 1873–1874, and the latter's own interpretation of the Law of Supply and Demand

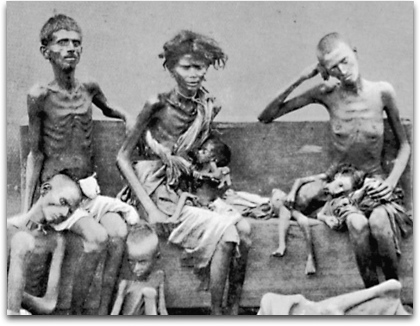
Victims of the Great Famine of 1876–1878 in British India, pictured in 1877. The famine ultimately covered an area of 670,000 square kilometres (257,000 sq mi) and caused distress to a population totalling 58,500,000. The death toll from this famine is estimated to be in the range of 5.5 million people.

== See also ==
- Famine in India (British rule)
- Company rule in India
- Drought in India
- Famine in India
- List of famines
