= Great Famine =

Great Famine may refer to:

== China ==
- Great Chinese Famine (1958–1961)

== Greece ==
- Great Famine (Greece) (1941–1944)

== India ==
- Great Bengal famine of 1770
- Great Rajputana Famine (1869)
- Great Famine of 1876–1878

== Ireland ==
- Great Famine (Ireland) (1845–1852)

== Japan ==
- Kan'ei Great Famine (1640–1643)
- Great Tenmei famine (1782–1788)
- Tenpō famine or Great Tenpō famine (1833–1837)

== Lebanon ==
- Great Famine of Mount Lebanon (1915–1918)

== North Korea ==
- North Korean famine (1994–1998)

== Northern Europe ==
- Great Famine of 1315–1317
- Great Famine of 1695–1697

== Ukraine ==
- Holodomor or the Great Famine of 1932–1933

== Other uses ==
- The Great Famine, a 2011 documentary about the Russian famine of 1921

== See also ==
- Droughts and famines in Russia and the Soviet Union
- List of famines
