= Doji bara famine =

1790s famine in India

Map of India (1795) shows the Northern Circars, Hyderabad (Nizam), Southern Maratha Kingdom, Gujarat, and Marwar (Southern Rajputana), all affected by the Doji bara famine.

The Doji bara famine (also Skull famine) of 1791–1792 in the Indian subcontinent was brought on by a major El Niño event lasting from 1789–1795 and producing prolonged droughts. Recorded by William Roxburgh, a surgeon with the British East India Company, in a series of pioneering meteorological observations, the El Niño event caused the failure of the South Asian monsoon for four consecutive years starting in 1789.

The resulting famine, which was severe, caused widespread mortality in Hyderabad, Southern Maratha Kingdom, Deccan, Gujarat, and Marwar (then all ruled by Indian rulers). In regions like the Madras Presidency (governed by the East India Company), where the famine was less severe, and where records were kept, half the population perished in some districts, such as in the Northern Circars. In other areas, such as Bijapur, although no records were kept, both the famine and the year 1791 came to be known in folklore as the Doji bara (also Doĝi Bar) or the "skull famine," on account, it was said, of the "bones of the victims which lay unburied whitening the roads and the fields." As in the Chalisa famine of a decade earlier, many areas were depopulated from death or migration. According to one study, a total of 11 million people may have died during the years 1789–1792 as a result of starvation or accompanying epidemics of disease.

== Historical accounts ==
=== Maratha confederacy ===
==== Poona ====
According to the Gazetteer of the Bombay Presidency: Poona (1885),

The year 1791-92, though locally a year of plenty, was so terrible a year of famine in other parts of India that the rupee price of grain rose to twelve pounds (6 shers). In the next year, 1792-93, no rain fell till October, some people left the country and others died from want. The distress is said to have been very great. The Peshwa's government brought grain from the Nizam's country and distributed it at Poona. The rupee price of grain stood at eight pounds (4 shers) in Poona for four months and in the west of the district for twelve months.

Poona Produce Prices Pounds to the Rupee, 1788–1800
Article	1788	1789	1791	1792	1793	1798	1799	1800
Rice	40	36	26	8	9	36	40	24
Bájri	56	44	32	7	...	...	...	36
Jvári	56	54	48	8	...	...	...	48
Wheat	48	28	22	...	8	20	24	18
Tur	26	32	24	6	9	17	20	24
Gram	20	18	...	...	8	16	16	24

==== Dharwar ====
The Dharwar region suffered great distress. According to the Gazetteer of the Bombay Presidency: Dharwar, 1884,

In 1790, the march of the Marathas under Parashuram Bhau through Dharwar to Maisur was accompanied by such devastation, that on its return from Maisur the victorious army almost perished from want of food. In 1791-1792 there was a terrible famine, the result of a series of bad years heightened by the depredations caused by the Marathas under Parashuram Bhau. The distress seems to have been great in Hubli, Dambal, and Kalghatgi, where the people were reduced to feeding on leaves and berries, and women and children were sold. In Dambal the rains failed for twelve years and for three years there was no tillage. From the number of unburied dead the famine is remembered as Dogi Bára or the Skull Famine. The distressed were said to have been relieved by the rich. Beyond seizing some stores of grain at Hubli the Peshwa's government seem to have done nothing.

The prices of food grains spiraled up.

At Dambal grain was sold at two and a half pounds the rupee. In 1791 between 23 April and 6 May, the rupee price of rice was six pounds (3 pakka shers) at Kárur, Ránebennur, Motibennur, Háveri, Sháhánur, Kailkunda, Hubli, and Dhárwár; of gram six pounds (3 pakka shers) at Kárur, Motibennor, Hubli, and Dharwar, and eight pounds (4 pakka shers) at Háveri, Sháhánur and Kailkunda; and of Indian millet eight pounds (4 pakka shers) at Kárur, Ránebennur, Motibennur, Háveri, Hubli, and Dhárwár, and ten pounds (5 pakka shers) at Sháhánur and Kailkunda.

In contrast, some 80 years later, during 1868–69, a good crop year, the price of Indian millet had dropped to 90 pounds to the rupee.

==== Belgaum ====
The neighboring Belgaum region was similarly affected. According to the Gazetteer of the Bombay Presidency: Belgaum (1884),

In the following year 1791-92 the complete failure of the early rain caused awful misery. Hardly any records have been found regarding this famine. But tradition speaks of it as the severest famine ever known, extending more or less over the whole of the (present-day) Bombay Presidency except Sindh and to Madras and the Nizam's territory. In Belgaum the distress seems to have been heightened by the disturbed state of the country and by vast crowds of immigrants from more afflicted parts. Under these influences grain could hardly be bought. Some high-caste Hindus, unable to get grain, and rejecting animal food, poisoned themselves, while the poorer classes found a scanty living on roots, herbs, dead animals, and even corpses. The famine was so severe that it was calculated that fully half the inhabitants of many villages died; of those who survived many wandered and never returned. In 1791-92, in the town and district of Gokák, from starvation alone twenty-five thousand people are said to have perished. A story remains that a woman in Gokák under the pangs of hunger ate her own children, and in punishment was dragged at the foot of a buffalo till she died. From the numbers of uncared-for dead this famine is still remembered as the Dongi Bura or the Skull Famine. The estate-holders or jágirdárs are said to have done what they could to relieve the distress, but the Peshwa's government seems to have given no aid. Plentiful rain fell in October 1791 and did much to relieve the distress.

The prices of food grains had spiraled up in the Belgaum region as well.

In 1791 from the 7 to 15 May the rupee price of rice was six pounds (3 shers) at Dudhvad, Murgod, Bendvád, Ráybág, and Kudsi, eight pounds (4 shers) at Gokák, and ten pounds (5 shers) at Athni. The rupee price of gram was six pounds (3 shers) at Dudhvad and Murgod, eight pounds (4 shers) at Ráybág and Kudsi, and ten pounds (5 shers) at Athni. The rupee price of Indian millet was eight pounds (4 shers) at Dudhvad, Murgod, Ráybág, Kudsi, Gokák, and Bendvád; and twelve pounds (6 shers) at Athni.

Some 80 years later, in 1867–68, the price of Indian millet in the Belgaum region had dropped to 44 pounds to the rupee.

==== Bijapur ====
In Bijapur too,

No measures were taken to relieve the distress, and so many perished from want of food, that this famine is still remembered as the Dogi Barra or Skull Famine, because the ground was covered with the skulls of the unburied dead.

=== Hyderabad ===
In Hyderabad State, a princely state, ruled by Ali Khan Asaf Jah II, the Nizam, who had recently signed a subsidiary alliance with the British, and whose state was monitored by a British resident, the famine was acute as well.

In 1792-93 great distress prevailed in the Telingana Districts. When Sir John Kennaway resigned the office of Resident in 1794, he made a report to the Government of India concerning the administration of the State. He stated that owing to the famine, which had recently occurred many parts of the country had been depopulated, and that in consequence agriculture and cultivation generally were at a low ebb in the Nizam's Dominions. The famine was a very severe one. Some idea of its extent and severity may be gathered from the circumstances communicated to Sir John Kennaway by the Minister, Mir Alam: first, that in the space of four months 90,000 dead bodies had appeared by the Kotwal's account to have been carried out from Haidarabad and its suburbs, in which those who perished in their houses and enclosures were not inserted; and second, that of 2,000 weavers' huts which were full of families in a district of Raichur before the famine broke out, only six were inhabited at its close. The extent of the calamity may be judged from a tradition which exists to this day, that the country in which the famine prevailed is said to have been dotted with skulls. It is known as the "Doi Barra," or skull famine. In the year after the famine there were such heavy rains that cultivation could not be attempted, and the distress was in consequence greatly aggravated. While the famine lasted, the Minister paid the cost of feeding 150 famine-stricken people daily out of his own pocket. Beyond this no endeavour seems to have been made to provide food for the starving people, and attempts were actually made in many districts to collect revenue. Forced collections and imposts were levied from some of the Amildars or district revenue collectors, two of whom, those of Nirmal and Aurangabad, fled from their districts, owing (the Nizam's) Government a balance of ninety and twenty lakhs of rupees respectively. The Resident, Sir John Kennaway, referred to the ruin and mismanagement by which the Minister was surrounded, and it is evident that the country was in a very wretched condition.

=== Madras Presidency ===
In the Madras presidency, the famine was less severe than farther north in the Deccan.

Seven years had scarcely elapsed, when another serious dearth took place in the northern districts of the Presidency, and the pressure was apparently felt for about two years, viz., from November 1790 to November 1792. In April 1791, it was stated, that 1,200 persons had died of starvation in the neighbourhood of Vizagapatam, and early in 1792, the district of Ganjam was in great straits for food, and those of Ellore, Rajamundry, and Condapilly, in serious distress. From Masulipatam, it was reported, that there had been numerous deaths from starvation in all quarters of the neighbouring country, and the greatest difficulty was felt in supplying the inhabitants of the town with food, though the consumption had been at one time restricted to 1/4 seer, or half a pound, per head, per diem. The price of rice in the town, had been at one time four Madras measures per rupee (or 2d. per lb.) Rice was also raised in price to 12 seers (8 Madras measures), the rupee, (1d., per lb) in Ganjam. At an early period, the Government suspended the import and transit duties on all kinds of grain and provisions, and directed the local officers to afford every encouragement and assistance to the merchants in importing grain, but, at the same time, to prevent any improper attempts to raise the prices. They also requested the Bengal Government to encourage the export of grain to the northern districts of Madras, and they imported considerably from the same quarter on government account. In addition to these measures of relief, the Government found it necessary at the latter part of 1791, to prohibit the export of rice from Tanjore, until June 1792, except to the distressed districts, to permit 50 bags (about 7,500 lbs.) of rice, per mensem, to be distributed in charity, from the Government stores, at Vizagapatam, and to authorize the Collector of Ganjam to feed the poorest classes upon rice and natcheny porridge, at a cost of Rs. 200 to Rs. 300, per mensem. The pressure became at last so severe in this district, that Mr. Snodgrass, the Resident at Ganjam, collected local subscriptions for the relief of the poor, and employed 2,000 of them on public works, paying them their wages in grain from the Government stores.

== See also ==
- Timeline of major famines in India during British rule (1765 to 1947)
- Famines, Epidemics, and Public Health in the British Raj
- Company rule in India
- Famine in India
- Drought in India
