= Orissa famine of 1866 =

One of the biggest famines in India

Odisha famine of 1866 Na'Anka Durbhikshya ନ'ଅଙ୍କ ଦୁର୍ଭିକ୍ଷ
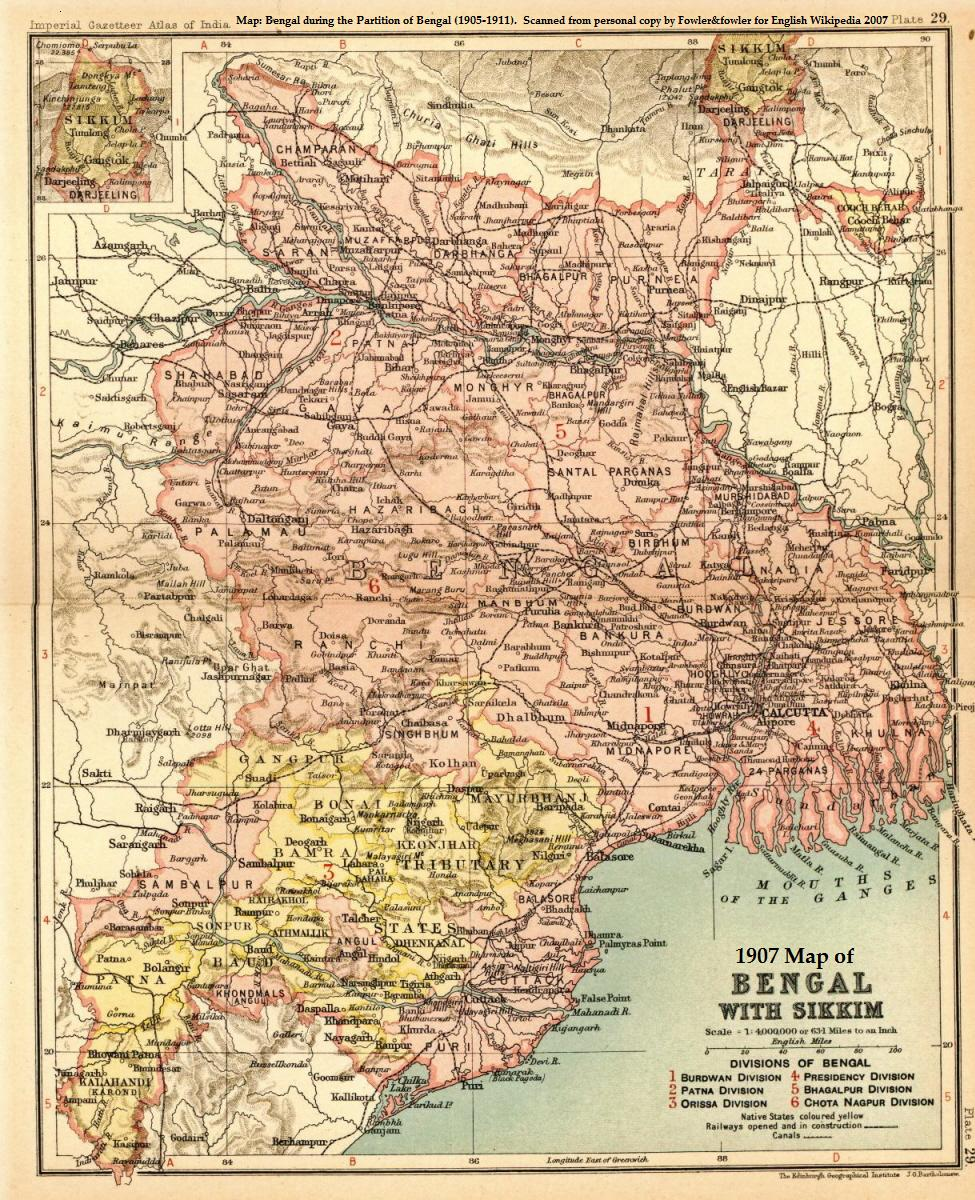
- A 1907 map of Orissa, now Odisha, shown as the southwestern region of Bengal Province. Coastal Balasore district was one of the worst-hit areas in the Odisha famine of 1866.
- Country: India
- Location: Odisha
- Coordinates: 20.398464°N 84.402366°E
- Period: 1866-1868
- Total deaths: 4-5 million
- Causes: Drought
- Relief: INR 9,500,000
- Net food imports: 40,000 tons of Food grains
- Effect on demographics: Approximately 33% of the population died
- Preceded by: Guntur famine of 1832
- Succeeded by: The Great Indian famine of 1876

The Orissa famine of 1866 affected the east coast of India from Madras northwards, an area covering 180,000 miles and containing a population of 47,500,000; the impact of the famine, however, was greatest in the region of Orissa, now Odisha, which at that time was quite isolated from the rest of India. In Odisha, the total number of deaths as a result of the famine was at least a million, roughly one third of the population.

== Causes ==
The famine was initially triggered by a severe drought following the failure of the southwest monsoon in 1865, which devastated the region's winter rice crop. However, modern historians largely attribute the catastrophic mortality rate to the colonial administration's strict adherence to laissez-faire economic policies and administrative negligence.

Despite widespread crop failures, the Bengal Board of Revenue, led by Lieutenant-Governor Cecil Beadon, refused to intervene in the grain market. Guided by Malthusian principles, officials believed that free trade would naturally correct shortages and that government intervention would be inherently harmful. During the early months of the scarcity, India exported over 200 million pounds of rice to Britain, severely depleting local reserves. Beadon dismissed the suffering as a natural inevitability, declaring, "Such visitations of providence as these no government can do much either to prevent or alleviate". When pressured to regulate soaring grain prices to save lives, Beadon refused, stating that attempting to control the market would make him "no better than a dacoit or thief".

The crisis was exacerbated by mismanagement at the local level. T. E. Ravenshaw, the Commissioner of the Orissa Division, was a British bureaucrat new to the region and largely unacquainted with local society, customs, and economics. Misled by fictitious price lists provided by local zamindars and grain merchants, Ravenshaw underestimated the severity of the shortage, ignored early reports of starvation, and assured the government that food reserves were sufficient. His administrative actions were strictly constrained by the instructions of higher authorities, preventing him from taking precautionary steps to store food grains.

By the time the administration realised the gravity of the situation in May 1866, the summer monsoons had already set in. When Ravenshaw was directly confronted by masses of starving people in early August 1866, he requested emergency rice supplies from Beadon. Beadon denied the request on the grounds that arranging the logistics would take too long. When the British Indian government finally attempted a relief effort, Orissa's geographical isolation, lack of railway connections, and poor road infrastructure hindered progress. Ships could not unload their cargo due to rough monsoon seas, leaving interior districts entirely cut off. Historian Dinyar Patel notes "Orissans paid with their lives for bureaucratic foot-dragging".

== Course and relief ==
Efforts to ship food to the isolated province were hampered by bad weather, and when some shipments did reach the coast of Odisha, they could still not be moved inland. The British Indian government imported some 10,000 tons of rice, which reached the affected population only in September. Although many people died of starvation, more were killed by cholera before the monsoons and by malaria afterwards. In Odisha alone, at least 1 million people, a third of the population, died in 1866, and overall in the region approximately 4 to 5 million died in the two-year period.

The heavy rains of 1866 also caused floods which destroyed the rice-crop in low-lying regions. Consequently, in the following year, another shortfall was expected, and the Government of British India imported approximately 40,000 tons of rice at four times the usual price. However, this time they overestimated the need, and only half the rice was used by the time the summer monsoon of 1867. This was followed by a plentiful harvest and this marked the end of the famine in 1868. In the two years of the famine, the Government of British India spent approximately Rs.9,500,000 on famine relief for 35 million units (i.e. one person per day); a large proportion of the cost, however, was the high price of the imported grain.

== Effects of drought ==
The fallout of the famine tarnished the career of Bengal Lieutenant Governor Sir Cecil Beadon, forcing him into retirement after a specially appointed inquiry, the Campbell Commission of 1866, found his administration lacking. The commission, spearheaded by Sir George Campbell, concluded that Beadon had grossly miscalculated the scale of the disaster, misled the central government, and blindly relied on laissez-faire economic doctrines while exporting critical food grains.

Lessons learnt from this famine by the British rulers included "the importance of developing an adequate network of communications" and "the need to anticipate disaster". Indian Famine Codes were slowly developed which were "designed to be put into place as soon as a failure of the monsoon, or other warning-signal, indicated a probable shortage". One early success of this new approach was seen in the Bihar famine of 1873-74 when the famine relief under Sir Richard Temple resulted in the avoidance of almost all mortality.

The famine commission's report highlighted the absence of transportation infrastructure in the Orissa deltas. In order to alleviate the effects of a future famine, the British Raj built the Orissa Coast Canal (now Odisha Coast Canal), a 124 km segment of the East Coast Canal, stretching north from Charbatia to Rasulpur, the border of West Bengal. Construction of the canal started during 1880 and the canal was fully opened for traffic in 1888.

== See also ==
- Timeline of major famines in India during British rule (1765 to 1947)
- Famines, Epidemics, and Public Health in the British Raj
- Company rule in India
- Famine in India
- Drought in India
