= Agra famine of 1837–1838 =

Famine

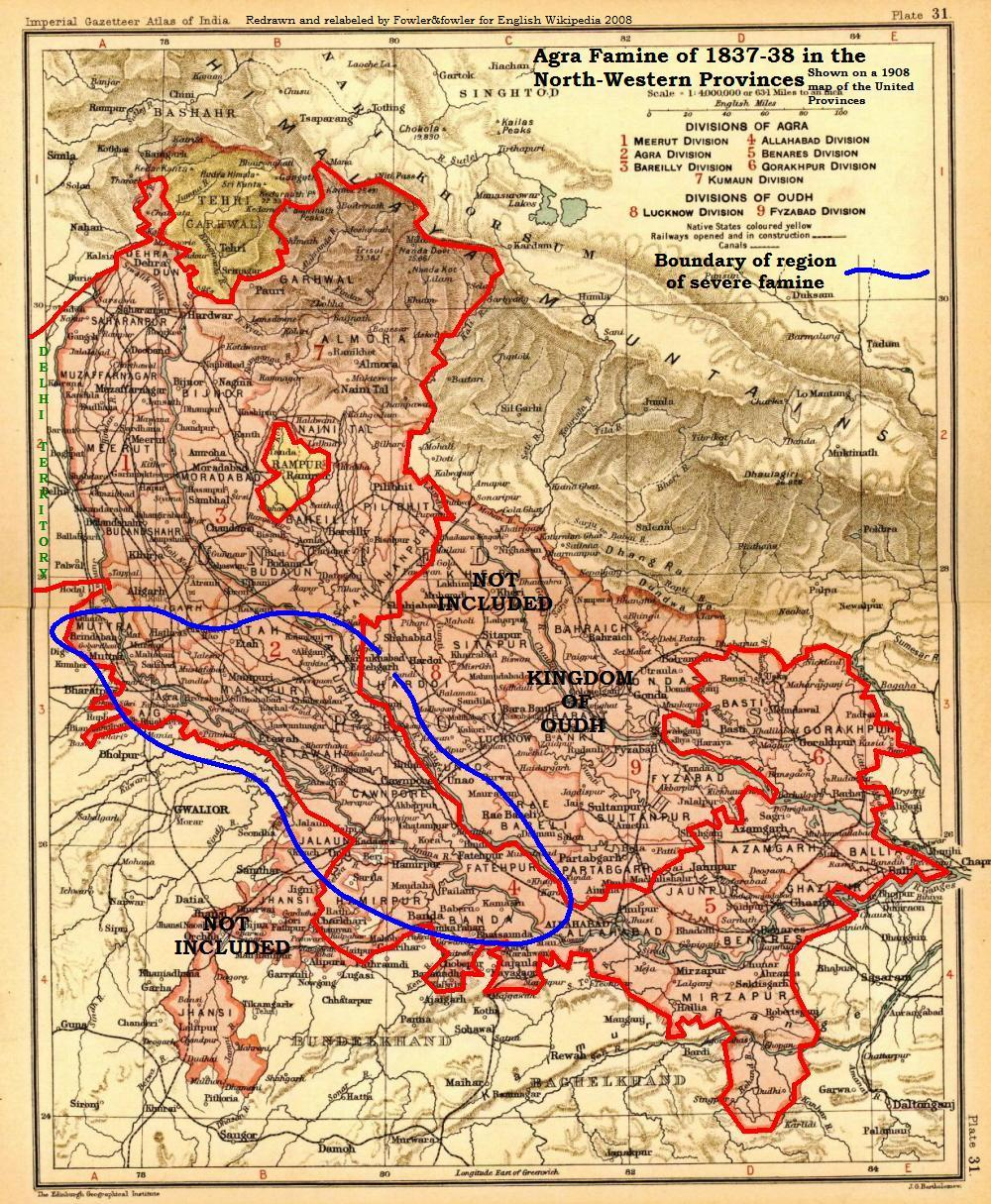
Map of the North-Western Provinces showing the region severely afflicted by the famine (in blue).

The Agra famine of 1837–1838 was a famine in the newly established North-Western Provinces (formerly Ceded and Conquered Provinces) of Company-ruled India that affected an area of 25,000 square miles (65,000 km^{2}) and a population of 8 million people. The central Doab in present-day Uttar Pradesh—the region of the districts of Kanpur, Etawah, Mainpuri, Agra and Kalpi—was the hardest hit; the trans-Jumna districts of Jalaun, Hamirpur, and Banda also suffered extreme distress.

By the end of 1838, approximately 800,000 people had died of starvation, as had an even larger number of livestock. The famine came to be known in folk memory as chauranvee, (Hindi, literally, "of ninety four,") for the year 1894 in the Samvat calendar corresponding to the year 1838 CE.

== Onset of the famine ==
There had been a number of droughts and near-famines in the region in the first third of the nineteenth century. The years of scarcity included: 1803–1804, 1813–14, 1819, 1825–26, 1827–28, and 1832–33. Especially in the 1830s, a number of factors—which included a decade long economic depression, ecological changes in the region, and likely El Niño events—conspired to create a succession of scarcities, of which the Agra famine of 1837–38 was the last.

The 1837 summer monsoon rains failed almost entirely in the region of the Doab lying between Delhi and Allahabad as well in the trans-Jumna districts. During August and September 1837, reports of both severe drought and the failure of the kharif (or autumn) harvest rushed in from different parts of the region. By the time the Governor-General of India, Lord Auckland, assumed charge of the administration of the North-Western Provinces on 1 January 1838, the winter monsoon rains had failed as well, and no rabi (or spring) harvest was expected. A famine was, consequently, declared and Auckland commenced a tour of the famine-afflicted regions. In his report to the Court of Directors of the East India Company dated 13 February 1838, Auckland wrote not only about human distress, but also about the impact of the famine on livestock:

"... harrowing accounts of famine and distress pour in from Calpee, Agra, Etawah and Mynpoorie ... not only has the khareef crop in these districts entirely failed but the grass and fodder were also lost. This has led to extensive mortality amongst the cattle, and in some districts nearly all those which have not perished on the spot, have been driven off to other parts of the country in order that they might be saved. It has thus happened that great difficulty has been experienced in irrigating the land for the rubbee crops, and much land which would otherwise have been cultivated has lain waste from this want of means of irrigation."

Other nineteenth-century accounts also spoke of distress, chaos, and migration southwards:

"Grain merchants closed their shops, the peasantry took to plunder; cattle starved and died; in the part of the Mathura district west of the Jumna, the village thatches were torn down to feed the starving beasts. There was a general move of the people in the direction of Mâlwa, that Cathay or land of plenty, where, in the imagination of the North Indian rustic, the fields always smile with golden grain and poverty is unknown."

Auckland found the conditions in these districts to be so distressing that, in his words, "the largest expenditure" was required "in order to palliate the evil, and prevent the total depopulation of the country by starvation and emigration."

== Relief ==
Although some relief was provided in the last few months of 1837, famine relief on a large scale did not begin until February 1838. In his report to the Governor-General of February 1838, Mr. Rose, the Deputy-Collector of Cawnpore observed that while the relief was still insufficient, it had nonetheless lessened the distress somewhat, and had, according to him, stemmed the tide of emigration to other regions. It had also served, in his view, as an exemplar in encouraging others to organize their own relief efforts. Rose wrote:

"... the relief afforded, in its present state, is inadequate to the wants of the people, but it must not on that account be considered valueless. Thousands have by it been saved from death by starvation, and the flood of emigration has been checked. The aid afforded ... will ... evince to the people that the Government are anxious to relieve their present unparalleled suffering, and the example thus set forth has ... been an inducement to hundreds to bestir themselves, on behalf of the starving poor, who never before thought of lending their aid in relieving the distress."

From the onset of the scarcity, the Government provided only "work-relief" for able bodied persons. "Charitable relief," or relief for the old and indigent, was left to private efforts. At first, local grain merchants were drafted in the relief effort: the laborers in the relief works received ration tickets which they then exchanged for grain at the grain merchant's; the merchant, in turn, recovered the cost of the grain plus his profit by presenting the tickets to the government. Soon, however, it was discovered that the merchants were adulterating the grain rations to fully half their weight with "sand or powdered bones." In April 1838, therefore, the Government took over the distribution of the rations. The table below gives the expenditure in the relief works in one district, Farrukhabad, for the duration of the scarcity.

Famine relief and expenditure in Farrukhabad district from August 1837 to August 1838
Year/Month	Total expenditure in Rupees (Rs.)	Number of persons relieved
1837		
August	494	9,848
September	1,825	35,568
October	1,884	36,990
November	1,375	21,965
December	1,553	25,632
1838		
January	6,845	138,778
February	13,884	273,468
March	27,595	476,346
April	20,591	359,041
May	25,913	459,045
June	33,609	530,621
July	21,392	350,532
August	6,046	106,493
Total	Rs. 163,006	2,824,397

According to Imperial Gazetteer of India vol. III 1907, p. 484, a total of Rs. 2,300,000 was spent on relief throughout the famine-afflicted region.

== Merchants ==
Merchants as a class were variably affected by the famine, with some wealthier merchants, who had sufficient capital to diversify their holdings, profiteering, even as the poorer ones suffered much distress. At the onset of the famine, the rich salt merchants of the middle Doab were immediately able to switch from salt to grain and make windfall profits. The small salt merchants, especially the itinerant merchants, however, did not have such flexibility. According to Bayly 2002, p. 293, a British military officer observed Banjara merchants—who had traditionally traded salt from their region in Rajputana for grain from Rohilkhand to the north-east—returning "from the northern markets of Farrukabad and Shahjahanpur" with no loads of grain on their cattle; the price of grain had been too high for them to turn a profit. Similarly, the intermediate salt merchants, who had traditionally bought salt in bulk from the big merchants and offered it on credit to the small ones, now found themselves with nothing to buy or sell.

The Agra region, had in fact had a serious economic downturn in the decade before, as bullion had become scarce. The smaller merchants, such as those selling "brass vessels, low grade cloths and liquor" had already been in considerable distress, since their patrons, the small farmers, had no surplus income to buy their goods with.

== See also ==
- Ceded and Conquered Provinces
- Chalisa famine
- Company rule in India
- Drought in India
- Famine in India
- Timeline of major famines in India during British rule
