= Rajputana famine of 1869 =

Great Rajputana Famine, Bundelkhand and Upper Hindustan famine

- Country: princely states of Rajputana, India, and the British territory of Ajmer
- Period: 1869
- Total deaths: 1.5 million
- Causes: late, brief monsoons, water shortage, swarms of locusts, epidemics

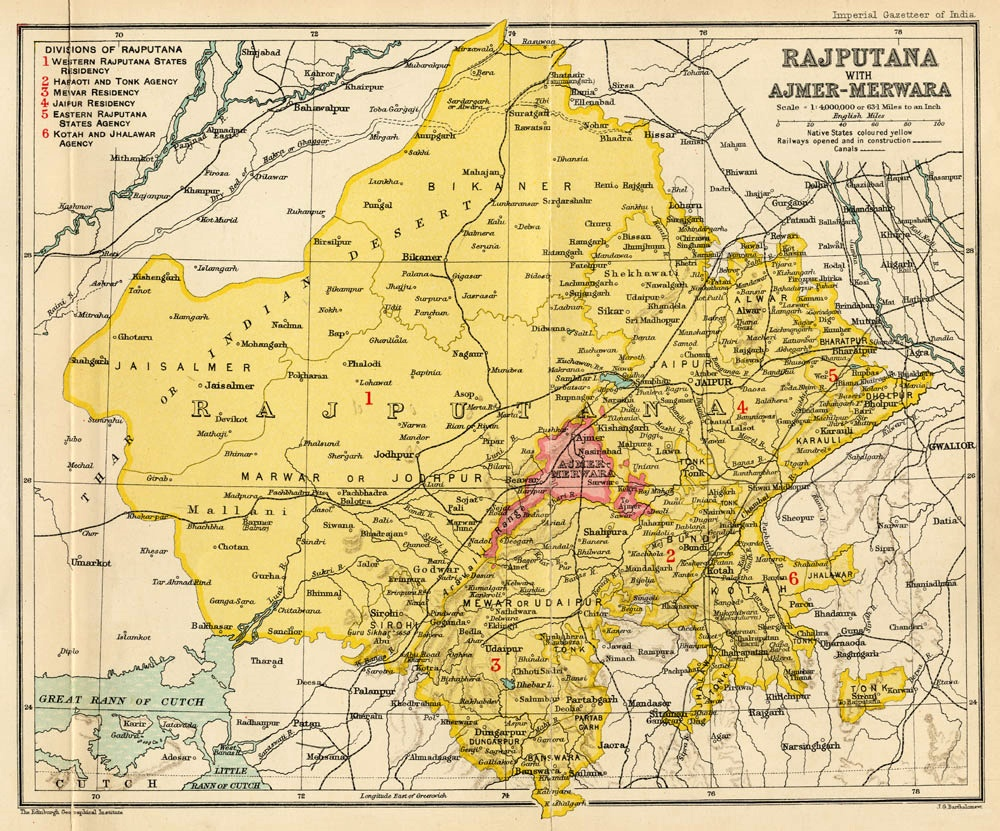
Map of Rajputana consisting of the princely states of the Rajputana Agency and the British territory of Ajmer-Merwara, in 1909; the map was little changed since the year of the famine, 1869.

The Rajputana famine of 1869 (also the Great Rajputana Famine, Bundelkhand and Upper Hindustan famine, Rajputana famine of 1868-70) affected an area of 296,000 square miles (770,000 km^{2}) and a population of 44,500,000, primarily in the princely states of Rajputana, India, and the British territory of Ajmer. Other areas affected included Gujarat, the North Deccan districts, the Jubbalpore division of the Central Provinces and Berar, the Agra and Bundelkhand division of the United Provinces, and the Hissar division of the Punjab.

== Course of famine ==
The monsoon of 1868 was late in coming. When it came, was light and brief, lasting until only August 1868. There was a shortage of fodder in most areas of Rajputana, and some areas had water shortages as well. Since the much-needed grain could be brought in only on slow camel trains, the stricken areas were more or less inaccessible.

Many inhabitants of the famine-stricken regions of Rajputana (for example, two-thirds of the population of Marwar) emigrated with their livestock or herds. Initially, they did not go to the British territory of Ajmer, where relief works had been arranged; many wandered in search of food until they died from starvation. Late in 1868, epidemics of cholera broke out among the vulnerable population, and there was no harvest in the spring of 1869.

In May 1869, many villagers, who had emigrated earlier now returned to their villages believing that the rains would be early. However, the rains held off until mid-July and, in the interim, many thousands more died of starvation. Even so, the autumn harvest promised to be abundant, but swarms of locusts descended upon the fields and destroyed the young crops. In September and October 1869, there were heavy rains that, although good for the spring harvest, caused an epidemic of malaria and killed many more. Finally, the anticipated harvest of spring 1870 arrived and ended the famine.

== Relief ==
Having been criticized for the badly bungled relief effort during the Orissa famine of 1866, British authorities began to discuss famine policy soon afterwards. In early 1868, Sir William Muir, Lieutenant-Governor of Agra Province, issued a famous order stating that:

"every District officer would be held personally responsible that no deaths occurred from starvation which could have been avoided by any exertion or arrangement on his part or that of his subordinates."

The Government of British India organized famine relief works in the British territory of Ajmer and in neighboring Agra Province of British India. In Ajmer, Rs. 49 lakhs were spent in the relief effort, Rs. 5 lakh in revenue remission, and Rs. 21 lakhs in a new scheme for agricultural credit. In Agra, another Rs. 30 lakhs were spent in relieving 29 million units (i.e., one person for one day).

The princely states of Rajputana provided very little relief: only Udaipur State spent Rs. 5 lakhs. Consequently, the immigration from the princely states into British India in the later stages of the famine began to overwhelm British efforts. In spite of Muir's newly defined responsibility for each district officer, the resulting mortality was great. It is thought that over 1.5 million people died all over Rajputana during the famine.

== See also ==
- Timeline of major famines in India during British rule (1765 to 1947)
- Famines, Epidemics, and Public Health in the British Raj
- Company rule in India
- Famine in India
- Drought in India
