= Upper Doab famine of 1860–1861 =

Famine in India

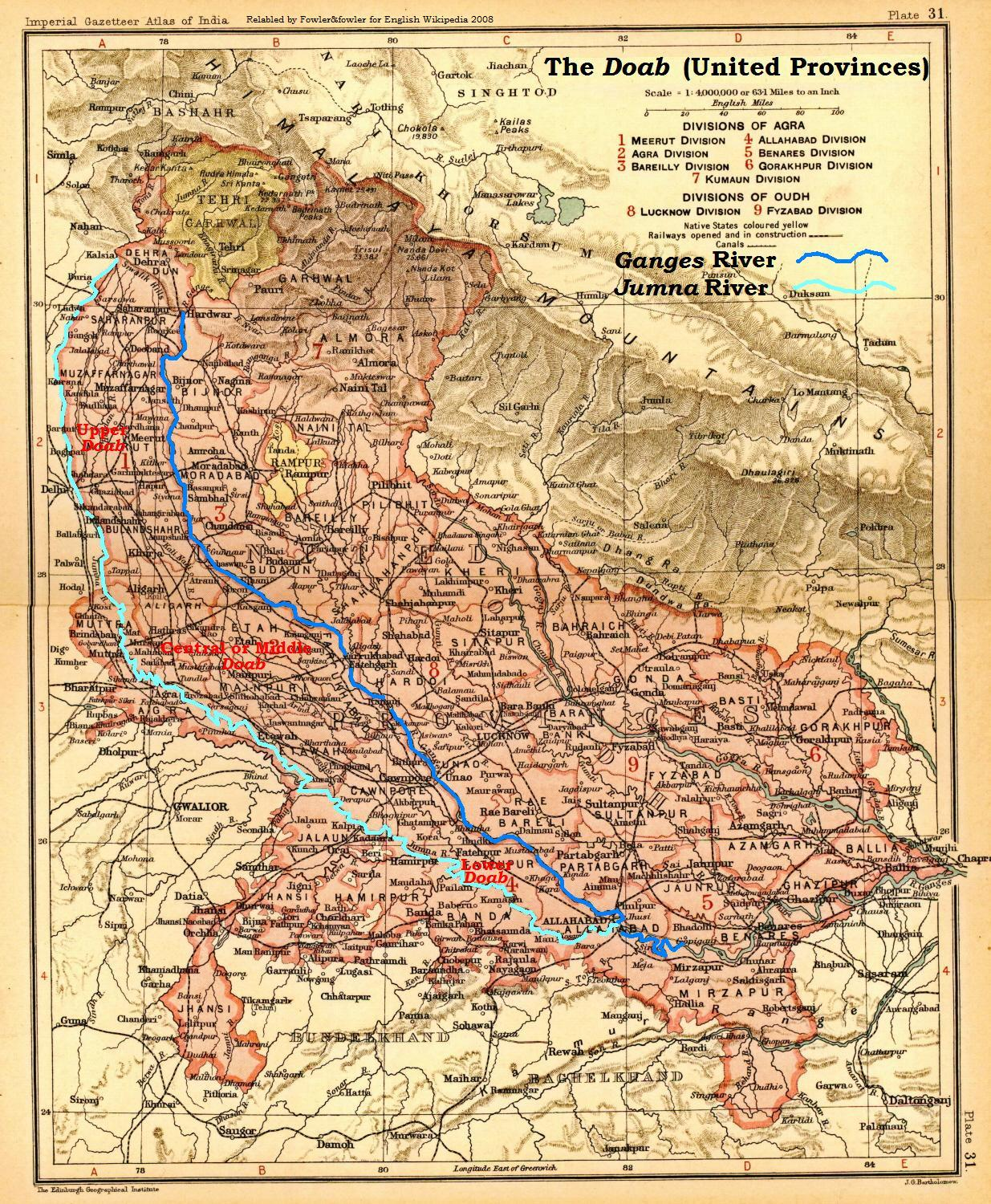
A map showing the Doab region

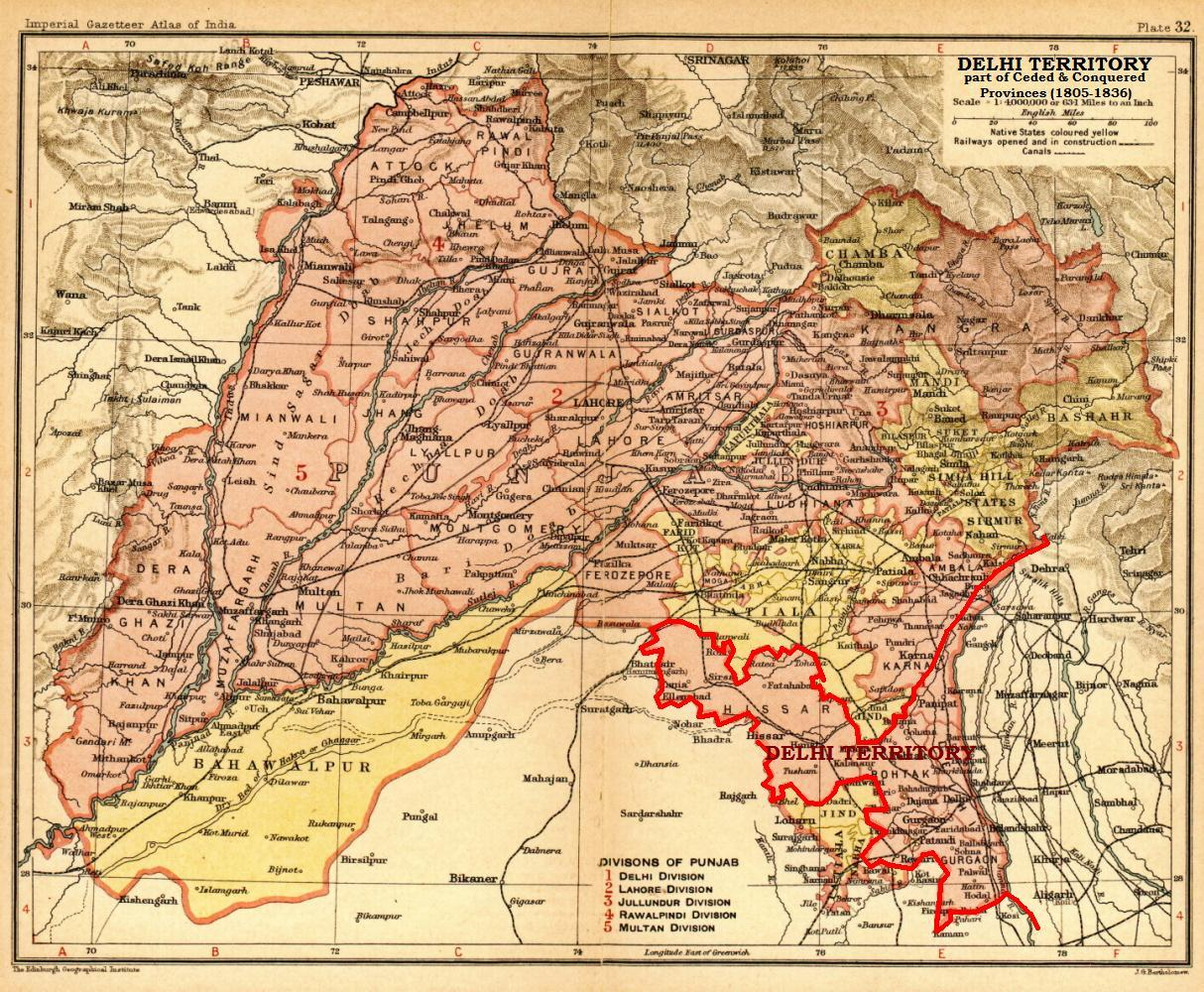
A map showing the Delhi territory and the Hissar district of the Punjab

The Doab famine of 1860–1861 was a famine in India that affected the Ganga-Yamuna Doab in the North-Western Provinces, large parts of Rohilkhand and Awadh, the Delhi and Hissar divisions of the Punjab, all in British India, then under Crown rule, and the eastern regions of the princely states of Rajputana. Up to 2 million people are thought to have perished in the famine.

== See also ==
- Timeline of major famines in India during British rule
