= 2024–2025 Namibia drought =

Drought in Southern Africa

Map from the Emergency Response Coordination Centre (ERCC) dated April 26, 2024, showing the drought and food situation in southern Africa

ERCC map of June 14, 2024, showing the drought and humanitarian situation in southern Africa

Drought situation in Africa (2024–2025)

The drought in Namibia in 2024–2025 was a nationwide dry spell in Namibia that led to serious humanitarian, ecological, and economic consequences in large parts of southern Africa after a significantly below-average rainy season in 2023–2024. On May 22, 2024, President Nangolo Mbumba declared a nationwide state of emergency due to the ongoing drought. Aid organizations reported exceptionally high levels of food insecurity in 2024–2025 as a result of severe rainfall deficits and heat.

== Climatological background ==
The drought followed significant precipitation deficits in the southern summer of 2023–2024. Attribution researchers were able to show that El Niño roughly doubled the probability of such a drought event during the meteorological southern summer, i.e., in December, January, and February (DJF), and that no significant warming influence could be detected for the DJF precipitation considered, while higher temperatures can increase evaporation and exacerbate the consequences of drought. In the context of the global climate crisis, 2025 was the third warmest year since records began, according to Copernicus data, with the three-year average for 2023–2025 exceeding 1.5 °C above pre-industrial temperatures for the first time, further increasing the baseline stress from heat and drought.

== Course ==
Effective May 22, 2024, the government declared a state of emergency in order to be able to respond quickly to supply shortages. At the same time, the government launched a nationwide drought relief program and extended support measures to all 14 regions, including food and water supplies and assistance for those particularly affected. ACAPS estimated that the number of people in IPC phase 3+ rose from around 390,000 (2022–2023) to around 695,000 (2023–2024) and up to 1.26 million in 2024–2025, highlighting the worsening crisis. The IFRC adjusted its assistance beyond 2025 to reflect the ongoing emergency and seasonal outlook.

== Impacts on population, agriculture, and ecosystems ==
The drought led to crop failures, feed and water shortages for livestock, and sharply rising food prices, exacerbating food insecurity, particularly in rural and poor households. To bridge the protein gap, the government decided in 2024 to allow the controlled hunting of wild animals (including elephants, hippos, buffalos, and zebras) for the distribution of meat to households in need, which was controversially discussed both domestically and abroad. In 2025, the government reported distributing approximately 142,000 kg of elephant meat to households in several regions as part of the drought relief program. Ecologically, large-scale losses of succulent plants have been documented in Namibia and South Africa, which are associated with advancing desertification, frequent heat waves, and degradation processes.

== Reactions and help ==
The government coordinated food aid, water supply, and social support, while international partners provided logistical, financial, and technical assistance. The IFRC launched an emergency appeal in 2024 and published several situation and implementation reports in 2025, adjusting its response to the changing situation and seasonal outlook. The particular vulnerability of households dependent on rain-fed agriculture and subsistence farming, as well as the increase in precarious coping strategies and malnutrition, were the main focus.

== Scientific context ==
For the regional drought event of 2023–2024, attribution studies showed that El Niño was the key factor for the observed DJF precipitation deficits, while a significant warming influence on precipitation probability was not detectable. At the same time, global warming exacerbates the effects of existing precipitation deficits through higher evaporation and heat extremes. Against this backdrop, climate adaptation is becoming increasingly important within the known limits of adaptability in a warming world. Copernicus data on global warming show a permanently elevated thermal background that exacerbates the effects of drought, even when individual regional precipitation anomalies are primarily driven by natural variability such as El Niño.

== Literature ==
- El Niño key driver of drought in highly vulnerable Southern African countries. 2024. doi:10.25561/110770.
