= Bihar famine of 1873–1874 =

Famine in British India

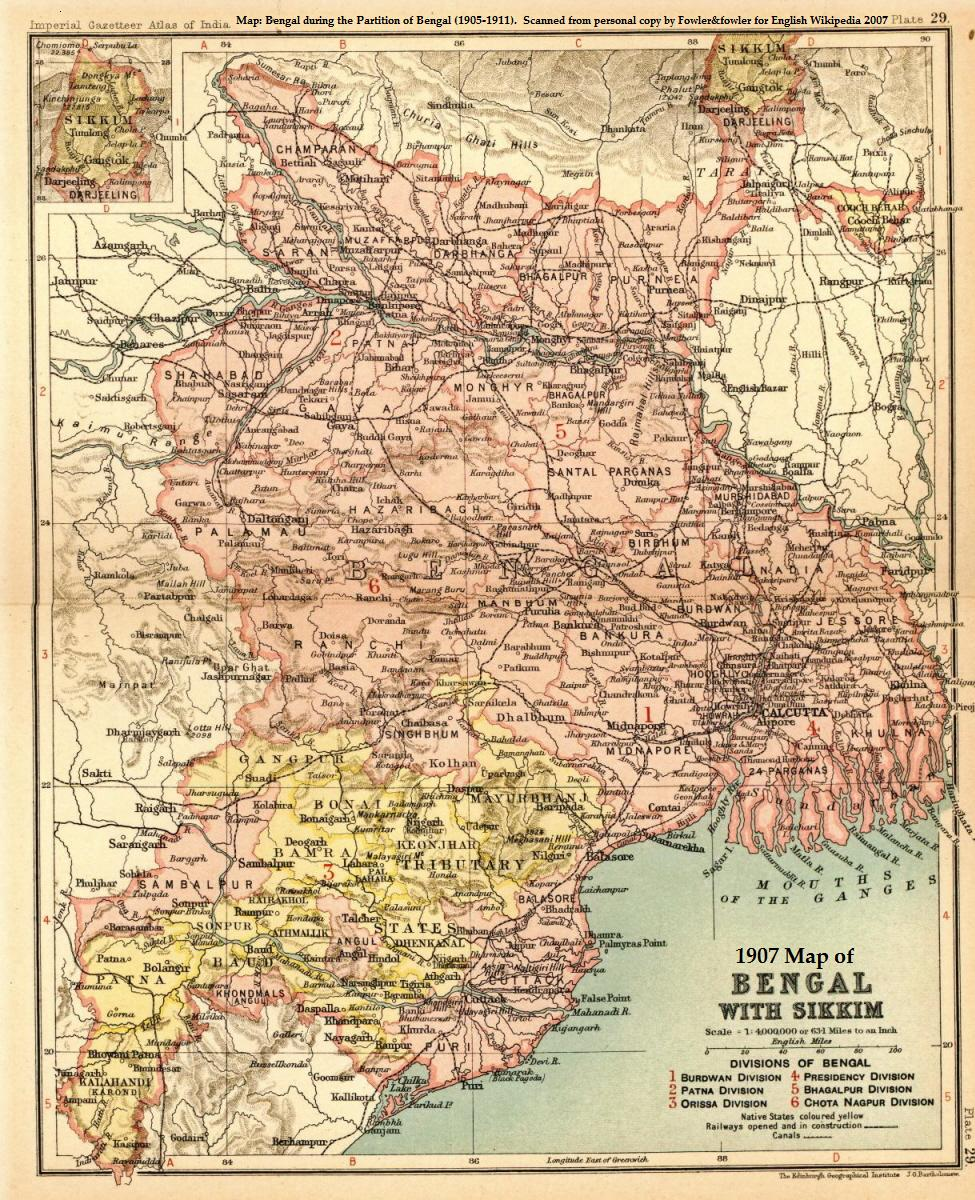
A 1907 map of Bihar, British India, shown as the northern region of Greater Bengal. Monghyr district (top middle) was one of the worst-hit areas in the Bihar famine of 1873–74.

The Bihar famine of 1873–1874 (also the Bengal famine of 1873–1874) was a famine in British India that followed a drought in the province of Bihar, the neighboring provinces of Bengal, the North-Western Provinces and Oudh. It affected an area of 140,000 square kilometres (54,000 sq mi) and a population of 21.5 million. The relief effort—organized by Sir Richard Temple, the newly appointed Lieutenant-Governor of Bengal—was one of the success stories of the famine relief in British India; there was little or no mortality during the famine. However, while some neighbouring princely states and outlying areas did experience excess deaths, with scholarly estimates ranging up from several hundred thousand to about 1.5 million.

== Relief ==
Illustration and story in Penny Illustrated, London, 14 February 1874, reporting Queen Victoria's donation of £1,000 in aid of famine relief. Since Bihar was then in the Bengal Presidency, the famine was also referred to as the Bengal Famine of 1873–74. The Queen is referred to as the "Empress of India" two years before she added that title.

As the impending famine came to light, a decision was made at the highest level to save lives at any cost. Rs. 40 million were spent on importing 450,000 tons of rice from Burma. Another Rs. 22.5 million were spent in organizing relief for 300 million units (1 unit = one person for one day).

In addition, for the first time, inspection of villages by the government officials was carried out to identify those in need of aid or employment. In Sir Richard Temple's own description (in a contemporary correspondence), the generous aid allowed the laborers to stay in good physical condition and to return to their fields when the rains finally arrived; their actions put to rest any fears among relief officials that the government handouts were making the laborers "dependent."

Road construction became a major project of the famine relief works; the Road Cess Act of 1875, which was enacted just before the famine began, established a fund for the "construction of roads, especially their metaling and bridging." The construction of the Irrawaddy Valley State Railway in Burma, which began in 1874, also provided employment in the earthworks for many famine immigrants from Bengal.

== Aftermath ==
The famine proved to be less severe than had originally been anticipated, and 100,000 tons of grain was left unused at the end of the relief effort. According to some, the total government expense was 50 percent more than the total budget of a similar relief effort during the Maharashtra famine of 1973 (in independent India), after adjusting for inflation.

Since the expenditure associated with the relief effort was considered excessive, Sir Richard Temple was criticized by British officials. Taking the criticism to heart, he revised the official famine relief philosophy, which thereafter became concerned with thrift and efficiency. The relief efforts in the subsequent Great Famine of 1876–78 in Bombay and South India were therefore very modest, which led to excessive mortality.

== See also ==
- Company rule in India
- Drought in India
- Famine in India
- Great Famine (Ireland)
- Great Famine of 1876–1878
- Bengal famine of 1943
- Famine in India
- Timeline of major famines in India during British rule
