= Indian Famine Codes =

Famine scale developed by the colonial British in India in the 1880s

The Indian Famine Codes, developed by the British Indian government in the 1880s, which were one of the earliest famine scales.

== Types of Food insecurity ==
The Famine Codes established three levels of food insecurity: near-scarcity, scarcity, and famine. "Scarcity" was defined as three successive years of crop failure, crop yields reaching one-third or one-half of the normal levels, and significant population distress. "Famine" included additional criteria such as a surge in food prices exceeding 140% of the "normal" value, mass migration of people in search of food, and widespread mortality.

== Indian Famine Commission ==
To address the issue of famine in India, an Indian Famine Commission was established to develop strategies for prevention and mitigation. In 1880, the commission's secretary drafted the Indian Famine Code, which served as the cornerstone of famine prevention measures until the 1970s. Subsequent famine codes were developed, such as the Indian Famine Code (Bihar), which shared similar principles with the original code and served as a foundation for multiple famine codes and scales. These codes and scales aimed to assess the severity and magnitude of famine. The Indian Famine Code was among the earliest attempts to forecast and subsequently prevent famine by implementing specific steps and interventions mandated for governments to mitigate the risks associated with food scarcity.

== See also ==
- Famine in India
- Timeline of major famines in India during British rule
