= Chalisa famine =

Famine in North India in 1783–1784

- Country: Present day India and Pakistan
- Period: 1783–1784
- Total deaths: between 11 and 20 million
- Causes: drought

Map of India (1765) shows Oudh, the Doab (the region in present-day Uttar Pradesh between the Ganges and Jumna rivers), Rohilkhand, the Delhi territories, eastern Punjab, Rajputana and Kashmir, all affected by the Chalisa famine.

The Chalisa famine of 1783–1784 in the Indian subcontinent followed unusual El Niño events that began in 1780 and caused droughts throughout the region. Chalisa (literally, "of the fortieth" in Hindustani) refers to the Vikram Samvat calendar year 1840 (1783). The famine affected many parts of North India, especially the Delhi territories, present-day Uttar Pradesh, Eastern and Western Punjab, Rajputana, and Kashmir, then all ruled by different Indian rulers. The Chalisa was preceded by a famine in the previous year, 1782–1783, in South India, including Madras City and surrounding areas (under British East India Company rule) and in the extended Kingdom of Mysore (under the rule of Haider Ali and Tipu Sultan).

Together the two famines may have depopulated many regions of India, including, for example, 17 percent of the villages in the Sirkali region of present-day Tamil Nadu, 60 percent of the villages in the middle Doab of present-day Uttar Pradesh, and over 30 per cent of the villages in the regions around Delhi. It is thought that up to 11 million people may have died in the two famines.

== See also ==
- Timeline of major famines in India during British rule (1765 to 1947)
- Famines, Epidemics, and Public Health in the British Raj
- Company rule in India
- Famine in India
- Drought in India
