= Drought in India =

Natural calamity

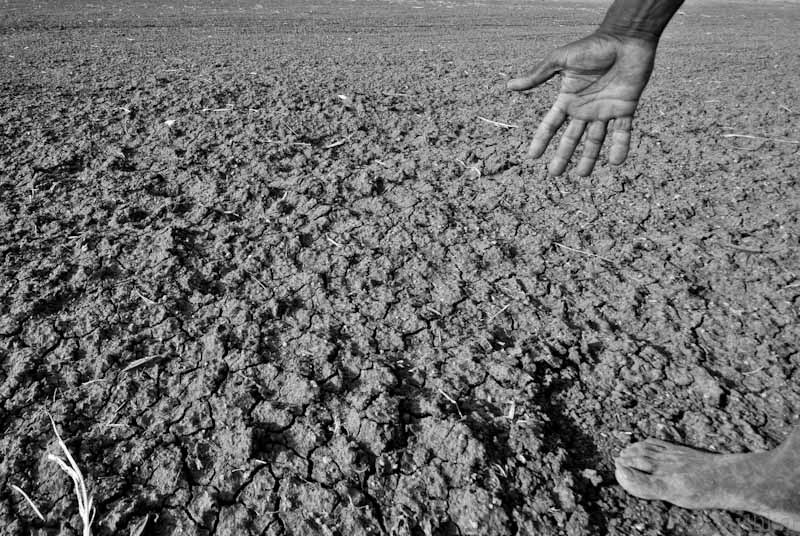
Drought-affected area in Karnataka, India, 2012

Drought has resulted in millions of deaths in India over the years. Indian agriculture is heavily dependent on the country's climate: a favorable monsoon is critical to securing water for irrigating India's crops. In parts of India, failure of the monsoons causes water shortages, resulting in poor yields. This is particularly true of major drought-prone regions southeastern Maharashtra, northern Karnataka, Andhra Pradesh, Odisha, Gujarat, Telangana, and Rajasthan.

== History ==
Only about 35% of total agricultural land in India is irrigated and two-thirds of cultivated land is entirely dependent on rainfall. As such, the agricultural production system in the country is more vulnerable to damage from extreme climatic events, which causes increased water stress leading to inadequate water supplies for irrigation. Already, rises in average temperatures, changes in rainfall patterns, increasing frequency of extreme weather events, such as severe droughts and floods, and the shifting of agricultural seasons have been observed in different agro-ecological zones of India. Long drought spells during Kharif and increased temperatures and unseasonal heavy rains during the rabi season have caused serious distress to the farming communities in different states in recent years. Four major farming systems are prevailing in India: the irrigated system, rainfed system, silvo-pastoral system, and desert farming.

In the past, droughts have periodically led to major Indian famines, including the Bengal famine of 1770, in which up to one third of the population in affected areas died; the 1876–1877 famine, in which over five million people died; and the 1899 famine, in which over 4.5 million died. In simple words, drought has destroyed India on a large scale. Eighteen meteorological and 16 hydrological droughts occurred in India between 1870 and 2018. The most severe meteorological droughts were in the years 1876, 1899, 1918, 1965, and 2000, while the five worst hydrological droughts occurred in the years 1876, 1899, 1918, 1965, and 2000. The drought of 1899 can be classified as meteorological as well as hydrological and was the most severe documented drought India has ever experienced to date.

Droughts correlate with heat waves (see List of Indian heat waves).

== Impact of El Niño ==
All such episodes of severe drought correlate with El Niño–Southern Oscillation (ENSO) events. El Niño-related droughts have also been implicated in periodic declines in Indian agricultural output. Nevertheless, ENSO events that have coincided with abnormally high sea surfaces temperatures in the Indian Ocean—in one instance during 1997 and 1998 by up to 3 °C (5 °F)—have resulted in increased oceanic evaporation, resulting in unusually wet weather across India. Such anomalies occurred during a sustained warm spell that began in the 1990s. A contrasting phenomenon is that, instead of the usual high-pressure air mass over the southern Indian Ocean, an ENSO-related oceanic low-pressure convergence center forms; it then continually pulls dry air from Central Asia, desiccating India during what should have been the humid summer monsoon season. This reversed airflow causes India's droughts. The extent that an ENSO event raises sea surface temperatures in the central Pacific Ocean influences the degree of drought. Around 43 percent of El Niño events are followed by drought in India.

== See also ==
- List of cleanest cities in India
- Climate of India
- Climate change in India
- Peak water
- Environment of India
- Kalpasar Project
- Dissolved load
- Indian rivers interlinking project
- Interstate River Water Disputes Act
- Irrigation in India
- List of drainage basins by area
- List of rivers of India by discharge
- List of rivers by discharge
- List of dams and reservoirs in India
- List of water supply and sanitation by country
- Polavaram Project
- Pollution of the Ganges
- Indian water policy
- Saemangeum Seawall
- Water scarcity in India
- Water supply and sanitation in India
- Water pollution in India
