= Great Bengal famine of 1770 =

Famine affecting lower regions of India in 1770

- India in 1765, showing the major towns in Bengal and the years in which they had been annexed by the British
- Country: British India (Company Rule)
- Location: Bengal
- Period: 1769–1770
- Total deaths: 1–10 million
- Causes: Crop failure and drought
- Relief: Attempts to stop exportation and hoarding or monopolising grain; 15,000 expended in importation of grains.
- Effect on demographics: Population of Bengal declined by around a third
- Consequences: East India Company took over full administration of Bengal

The Great Bengal famine of 1770 struck Bengal and Bihar between 1769 and 1770 and affected some 30 million people, which was about one third of the current population of the area. It occurred during a period of dual governance in Bengal. This existed after the East India Company had been granted the diwani, or the right to collect revenue, in Bengal by the Mughal emperor in Delhi, but before it had wrested the nizamat, or control of civil administration, which continued to lie with the Mughal governor, the Nawab of Bengal, Najmuddin Ali Khan (Nazm-ud-Daula) (1765–72).

Crop failure in autumn 1768 and summer 1769 and an accompanying smallpox epidemic were thought to be the manifest reasons for the famine. The East India Company had farmed out tax collection on account of a shortage of trained administrators, and the prevailing uncertainty may have worsened the famine's impact. Other factors adding to the pressure were: grain merchants ceased offering grain advances to peasants, but the market mechanism for exporting the merchants' grain to other regions remained in place; the East India Company purchased a large portion of rice for its army; and the Company's private servants and their Indian Gomasthas created local monopolies of grain. By the end of 1769 rice prices had risen two-fold, and in 1770 they rose a further three-fold. In Bihar, the continual passage of armies in the already drought-stricken countryside worsened the conditions. The East India Company provided little mitigation through direct relief efforts; nor did it reduce taxes, though its options to do so may have been limited.

By the summer of 1770, people were dying everywhere. Although the monsoon immediately after did bring plentiful rains, it also brought diseases to which many among the enfeebled fell victim. For several years thereafter piracy increased on the Hooghly river delta. Deserted and overgrown villages were a common sight. Depopulation, however, was uneven, affecting north Bengal and Bihar severely, central Bengal moderately, and eastern only slightly. The recovery was also quicker in the well-watered Bengal delta in the east.

Between seven and ten million people—or between a quarter and third of the presidency's population—were thought to have died. The loss to cultivation was estimated to be a third of the total cultivation. Some scholars consider these numbers to be exaggerated in large part because reliable demographic information had been lacking in 1770. They estimate lower at at least 1 million deaths. Even so, the famine devastated traditional ways of life in the affected regions. It proved disastrous to the mulberries and cotton grown in Bengal; as a result, a large proportion of the dead were spinners and weavers who had no reserves of food. The famine hastened the end of dual governance in Bengal, the Company becoming the sole administrator soon after. Its cultural impact was felt long afterwards, becoming the subject a century later of Bankim Chandra Chatterjee's influential novel Anandamath.

== Name and geography ==
The Bengali name Chiẏāttōrēr mônbôntôr (lit. 'Famine of '76') is derived from Bengali calendar year 1176 and the Bengali word meaning famine.

The regions in which the famine occurred affected the modern Indian states of Bihar and West Bengal in particular, but the famine also extended into Orissa and Jharkhand as well as modern Bangladesh. Among the worst affected areas were Central and Northern Bengal, and Tirhut, Champaran and Bettiah in Bihar. South-East and South Central Bengal escaped unscathed — it had an excess production in the famine years.

== Background ==
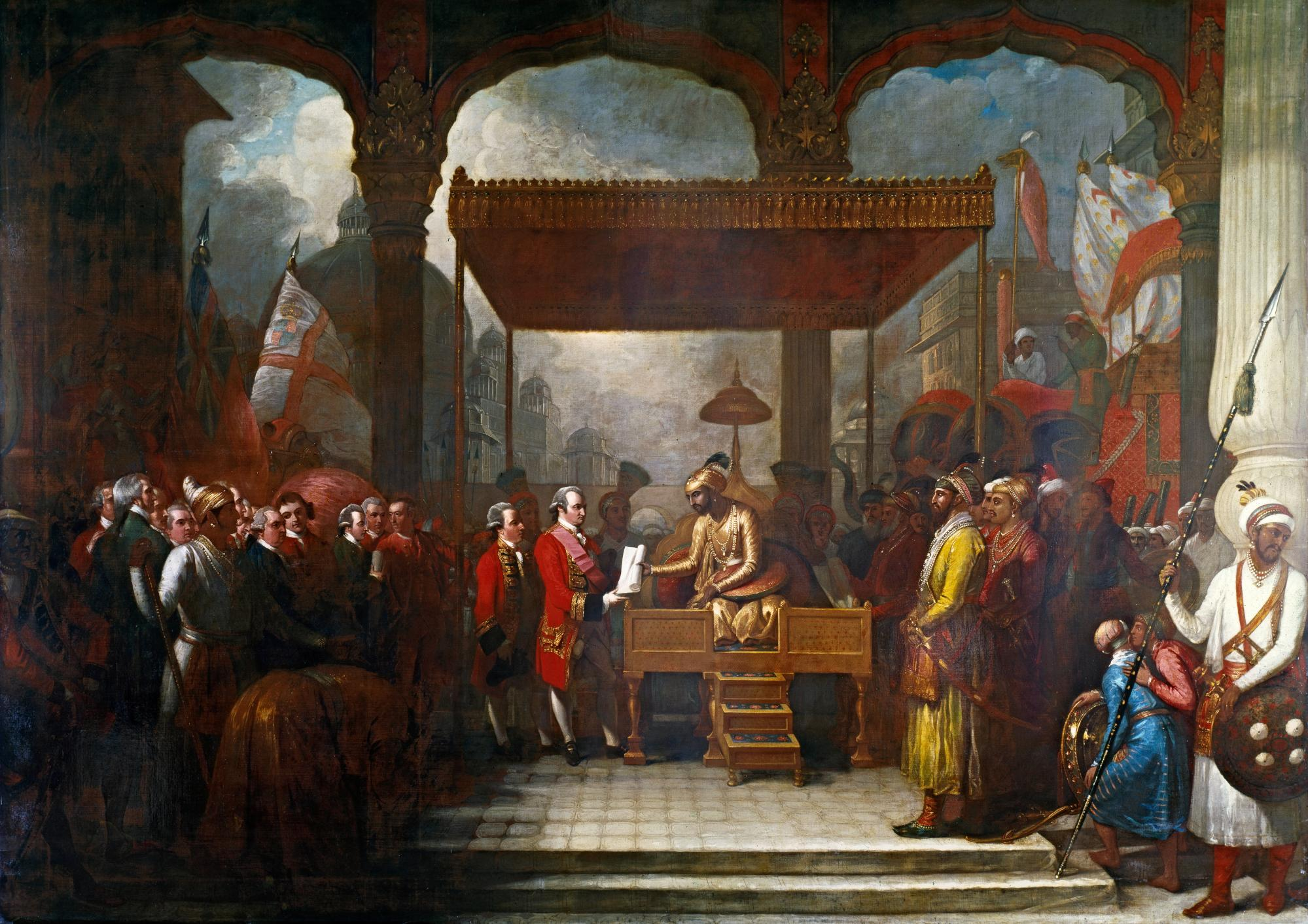
The Mughal emperor Shah Alam hands a scroll to Robert Clive, the governor of Bengal, which transferred tax collecting rights in Bengal, Bihar and Orissa to the East India Company, August 1765. Oil on canvas, Benjamin West, 1818.

The famine occurred in Bengal, then ruled by the East India Company. Their territory included modern Bangladesh, and parts of other Indian states. It was earlier a province of the Mughal Empire from the 16th century and was ruled by a nawab, or governor.

In the 17th century, the English East India Company was granted the town of Calcutta by the Mughal Prince Shah Shuja. During the following century, the company obtained sole trading rights for the province and became the dominant power in Bengal. In 1757, at the Battle of Plassey, the East India Company defeated the nawab Siraj Ud Daulah, annexing large portions of Bengal afterwards. In 1764 their military control was reaffirmed at Buxar. The subsequent treaty gave them taxation rights, known as dewan; the East India Company thereby became the de facto ruler of Bengal. In addition to profits from trade, the Company had been granted rights of taxation in 1764 and within a few years, had raised land revenue collections by about 30%.

== Pre-famine distress ==
The famine came in the backdrop of a multitude of subsistence crises that had affected Bengal since the early eighteenth century.

A failure of monsoon in Bengal and Bihar had led to partial shortfall of produce in 1768; market prices were higher than usual in early 1769. With usual rains in 1769, the situation eased for a while and grains were even exported to Madras Presidency. By late September, the situation was again bleak with drought-like-conditions on the horizon.

== Famine and policies ==
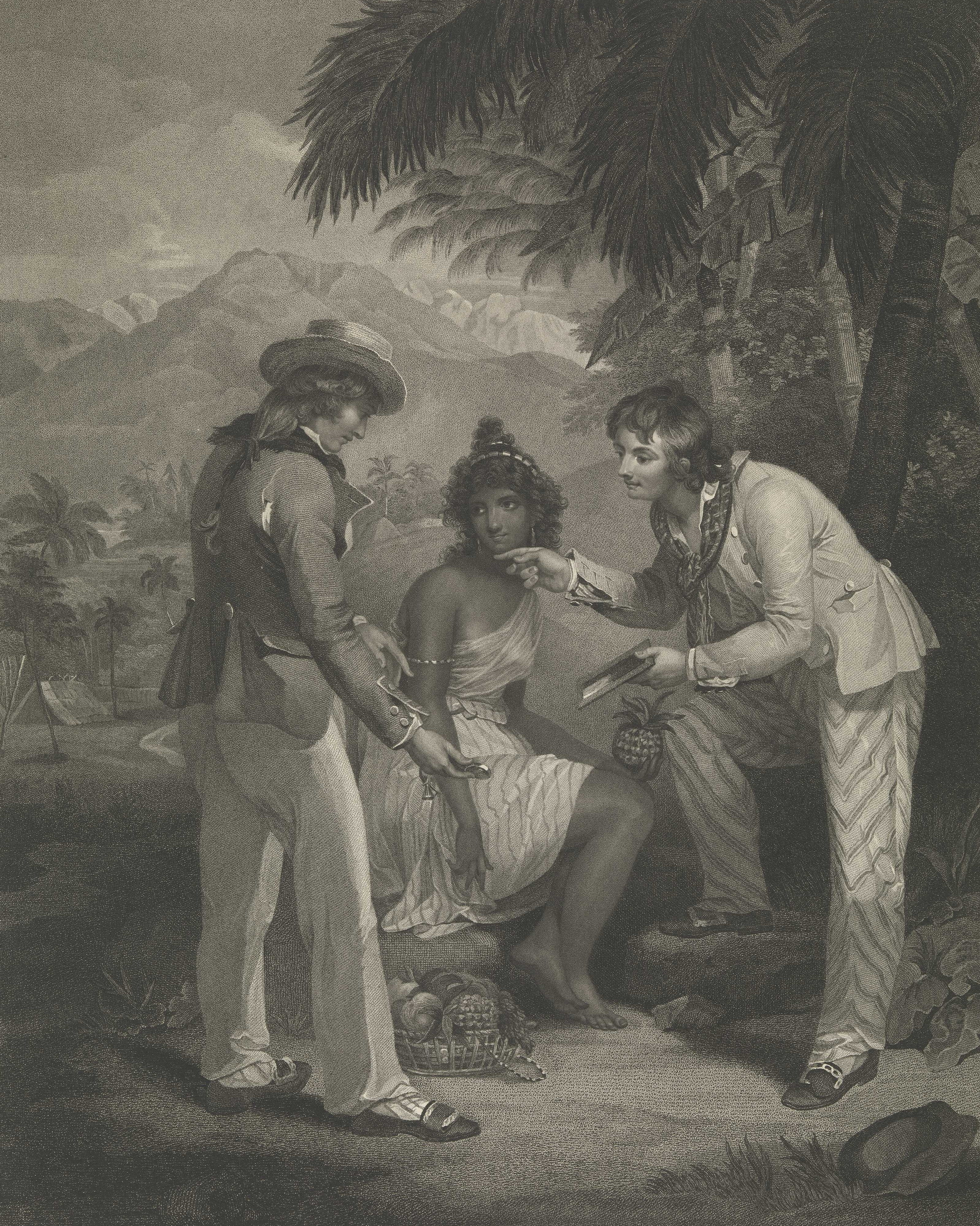
Print by Henry Singleton and Charles Knight entitled Scarcity in India, 1794, depicting two sailors bargaining with an Indian woman, offering a mirror and a watch in exchange for fruit

On 18 September 1769, Naib Nazim of Dhaka Mohammed Reza Khan informed Harry Verelst, President of the Council at Fort William about the "dryness of the season". The same month, John Cartier, Esquire (and Second-in-Command) of the Council chose to inform the Court of Directors in London about impending famine-like conditions in Bengal — a century later, W. W. Hunter would note this letter to be the "only serious intimation" about the approaching famine, and find the absence of President Verelst's affirmation to be striking. Other letters sent in the same month to the Board speculate about potential loss in revenue collection but do not discuss the famine. (Note: In December, Verelst retired from the Council without noting anything about a famine, which was already in process. Cartier was handed over the charges.)

On 23 October, Becher had reported to the Council about "great dearth and scarcity" of food grains at Murshidabad. This prodded the council to purchase 120,000 maunds of rice for its army, as an emergency measure. Charles Grant, Betcher's agent noted that the first sign of the famine was already visible in northern districts of Bengal by November. By late December, food prices had spiked sharply and the western districts of Bengal along with Bihar were also in a precarious condition.

On 7 December, Reza Khan and Shitab Rai proposed to the Council that they enforce a humane grain collection scheme for the upcoming fiscal year, in proportion to the individual produce of peasants. The proposal was not replied to; W. W. Hunter would later accuse that these people often had their incentives to dramatize general distress. On 25 January 1770, Cartier proposed to the Board that land taxes be remitted by about seven percent in afflicted areas on grounds of widespread suffering. Ten days later, Cartier reversed his stance noting that the revenues kept on being paid despite significant distress. On 28 February, the Council proposed that husbandmen who failed to pay the taxes be treated with leniency due to overbearing conditions of a poor harvest. Overall, no relief plan was yet designed by February. Despite initial hopes of a reversal in fortunes, there were no rains and the spring harvest was scanty; acting upon the advice of Reza Khan, the Council chose to increase taxes by 10% to meet revenue targets. Grain prices had kept rising across the year.

By middle of May, the distress had exploded into a full-blown famine marked with mass-starvation, beggary, and death. The prices of food would skyrocket, as the province ran out of money to pay for the scarce produces and trade effectively ceased. Khan noted that lakhs of people were dying daily, fires were widespread, and the tanks had not a drop of water. These conditions would continue for about three months.

=== Mitigation ===
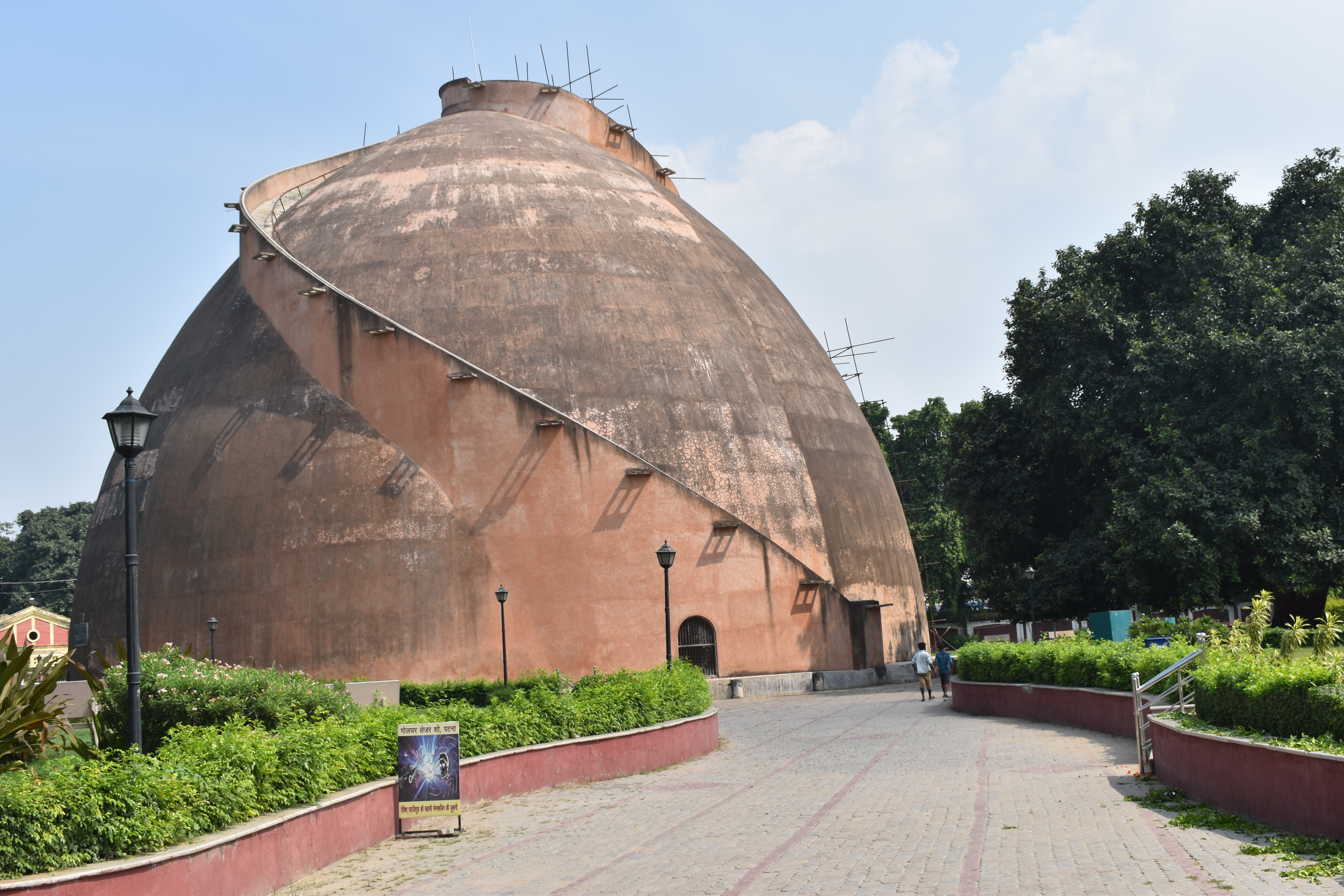
The Golghar granary at Bankipur, near Patna in Bihar. Built by Captain John Garstin in 1786 after several famines in the region in the previous two decades, the granary was found to be unsuitable for its purpose and was seldom used.

In October 1769, the Company requested that storehouses be constructed in Patna and Murshidabad; city officials were instructed to prevent monopoly of trade and have farmers raise "every sort" of dry grain, that was possible. The orders were largely unsuccessful; many Company officials along with their Indian assistants (Gomasthas) would exploit the famine to create grain-monopolies.

On 13 February, Khan and Becher proposed that six rice-distribution centers be opened in Murshidabad to provide half a seer of rice a day per head. The proposal was approved and the Council borne about 46% of the expenditure, the remaining sum were paid by Nawab Najabat Ali, Khan himself, Rai Durlabh, and Jagat Seth. One distribution center was opened by Reza Khan at his palace of Nishat Bagh. The Murshidabad model was later emulated in Calcutta and Burdwan to feed about 3000 men every day — at a daily expenditure of about 75 rupees — since early April. Rice were also charitably distributed at Purnea, Bhagalpur, Birbhum, Hugli and Jesore. Overall, about 4000 pounds of rice was arranged by the Company over six months.

Those in the employment of Company and Nizamat were especially favored. Becher obtained a total of 55,449 maunds of rice from Barisal, which was dispatched for Company troops and their dependents across Bengal. (Note: A net profit of 67, 595 Rupees was incurred. This was adjusted toward net distribution costs.)

Districts which exceeded a death-toll of twenty thousand per month were granted packages of 150 Rupees. Export-import embargoes were set up to check prices but they only contributed to worsening the situation — the province had no money to pay for the scarce produces and trade effectively ceased.

=== Death, migration, and depopulation ===
==== Contemporary estimates ====
In May 1770, the Court of Directors estimated that about one-third of the population (approx. ten million) had perished. The estimates were then revised by Becher on 2 June to about three in every eight people. On 12 July, Becher claimed that 500 people were dying in Murshidabad every day and the condition was far worse in the rural hinterlands; cannibalism was apparently on exhibition.

Malaria and cholera remained additional factors. A smallpox epidemic that coincided with the start of the pandemic was particularly severe and included Nawab Najabat Ali Khan of Murshidabad among the victims.

==== Modern scholarship ====
These figures have been uncritically reproduced by most modern scholars. Rajat Dutta, in a modern history of the economy of Bengal Province, claimed these figures to be "inflated" and carry "little conviction"; a revised toll of 1.2 million dead (~ 4-5% of the population) was put forward. Tim Dyson supports Dutta's claims of inflation, and notes the "popular" figure of ten million, indicative of at-least a 500% increase in annual death rate, to be "barely credible". However, Dyson refrains from making any specific estimate. Highlighted are the facts that contemporary Bengal lacked any significant demographic data outside Calcutta, the few reliable reports on effects of the famine were based on unrepresentative populations, and many cultivators were mobile settlers who simply migrated to better-off territories.

== Aftermath ==
The 1770 monsoons brought some marginal relief, and a perspective on the rampant depopulation — a letter by the Council regretted the wiping out of numerous "industrious peasants and manufacturers". The following year, as the drought receded, most of the land lacked tillers.

== Legacy ==
The economic and cultural impact of the famine was felt long afterwards, becoming the subject a century later of Bankim Chandra Chatterjee's novel Anandamath.

== See also ==
- Famine in India
- Timeline of major famines in India prior to 1765
- Timeline of major famines in India during British rule
- Bengal famine of 1943
- Deccan famine of 1630–1632
