= Gomasta =

Gomasta may refer to:

== Bangladesh ==
- Gomasta, Bangladesh
- Gomastapur, a village in Chapai Nawabganj District
- Gomastapur Upazila, an subdistrict of Chapai Nawabganj District

== India ==
- Gomastha, an Indian agent of the British East India Company
