= Famine in India =

Phenomenon of famines in the Indian subcontinent

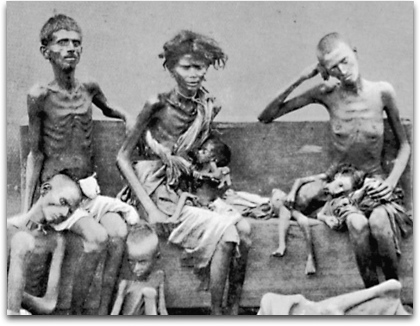
Victims of the Great Famine of 1876–78 in India, pictured in 1877

Famine has been a recurrent feature of life in the Indian subcontinental countries of India, Pakistan and Bangladesh, most commonly cited as a feature of British rule. Famines in India resulted in millions of deaths over the course of the 18th, 19th, and early 20th centuries. Famines in British India were severe enough to have a substantial impact on the long-term population growth of the country in the 19th and early 20th centuries.

Indian agriculture is heavily dependent on climate: a favorable southwest summer monsoon is critical in securing water for irrigating crops. Droughts, combined with policy failures, have periodically led to major Indian famines, including the Bengal famine of 1770, the Chalisa famine, the Doji bara famine, the Great Famine of 1876–1878, and the Bengal famine of 1943. Some commentators have identified British government inaction as a contributing factor to the severity of famines during the British rule in India. Famines in the subcontinent largely ended by the start of the 20th century, with the 1943 Bengal famine being an exception linked to complications during World War II. In India, traditionally, agricultural laborers and rural artisans have been the primary victims of famines. In the worst famines, cultivators have also been susceptible.

Railways built for the commercial goal of exporting food grains and other agricultural commodities only served to exacerbate economic conditions in times of famine. However, by the 20th century, the extension of the railway by the British helped put an end to the massive famines in times of peace. They allowed the British to expedite faster sharing of food out to the most vulnerable.

The last major famine to affect areas within the modern Republic of India was the Bengal famine of 1943. Within the areas that were formerly part of British India, the Bangladesh famine of 1974 was the last major famine.

== Ancient, medieval and pre-colonial India ==
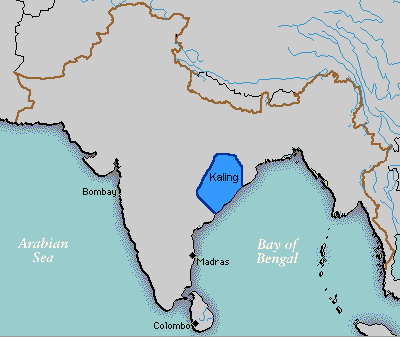
Kalinga in 265 BCE – Ashokan inscriptions record hundreds of thousands dying from famine and disease after the Kalinga War in 269 BCE.

One of the earliest treatises on famine relief goes back more than 2,000 years. This treatise is commonly attributed to Kautilya who was also known as Vishnugupta (Chanakya), who recommended that a good king should build new forts and water-works and share his provisions with the people, or entrust the country to another king. Historically, Indian rulers have employed several methods of famine relief. Some of these were direct, such as initiating free distribution of food grains and throwing open grain stores and kitchens to the people. Other measures were monetary policies such as remission of revenue, remission of taxes, an increase of pay to soldiers, and payment of advances. Yet other measures included the construction of public works, canals, and embankments, and sinking wells. Migration was encouraged. Kautilya advocated raiding the provisions of the rich in times of famine to "thin them by exacting excess revenue." Information on famines from ancient India up to colonial times is found in five primary sources:

1. Legendary accounts passed down in oral tradition that keep alive the memory of famines
2. Ancient Indian sacred literature such as the Vedas, Jataka stories, and the Arthashastra
3. Stone and metal inscriptions provide information on several famines before the 16th century
4. Writings of Indian historians in Mughal India
5. Writings of foreigners temporarily resident in India (e.g. Ibn Battuta, Francis Xavier)

The ancient Ashokan edicts of the Mauryan age around 269 BCE record emperor Asoka's conquest of Kalinga, roughly the modern state of Odisha. The major rock and pillar edicts mention the massive human toll of about 100,000 due to the war. The edicts record that an even larger number later perished, presumably from wounds and famine. From Indian literature, there is the 7th-century famine due to failure of rains in Thanjavur district mentioned in the Periya Puranam. According to the Purana, Lord Shiva helped the Tamil saints Sambandar and Appar to provide relief from the famine. Another famine in the same district is recorded on an inscription with details such as "times becoming bad", a village being ruined, and cultivation of food being disrupted in Landing in 1054.

Famines preserved only in oral tradition are the Dvadasavarsha Panjam (Twelve-year Famine) of south India and the Durga Devi Famine of the Deccan from 1396 to 1407.The Vanjari story of the great Durgadevi famine, which lasted from 1396 to 1407, is that it was named from Durga a Lad Vanjari woman, who had amassed great wealth and owned a million pack bullocks, which she used in bringing grain from Nepal, Burmah, and China. She distributed the grain among the starving people and gained the honourable title of ' Mother of the World, Jagachi Mata. The primary sources for famines in this period are incomplete and locationally based.

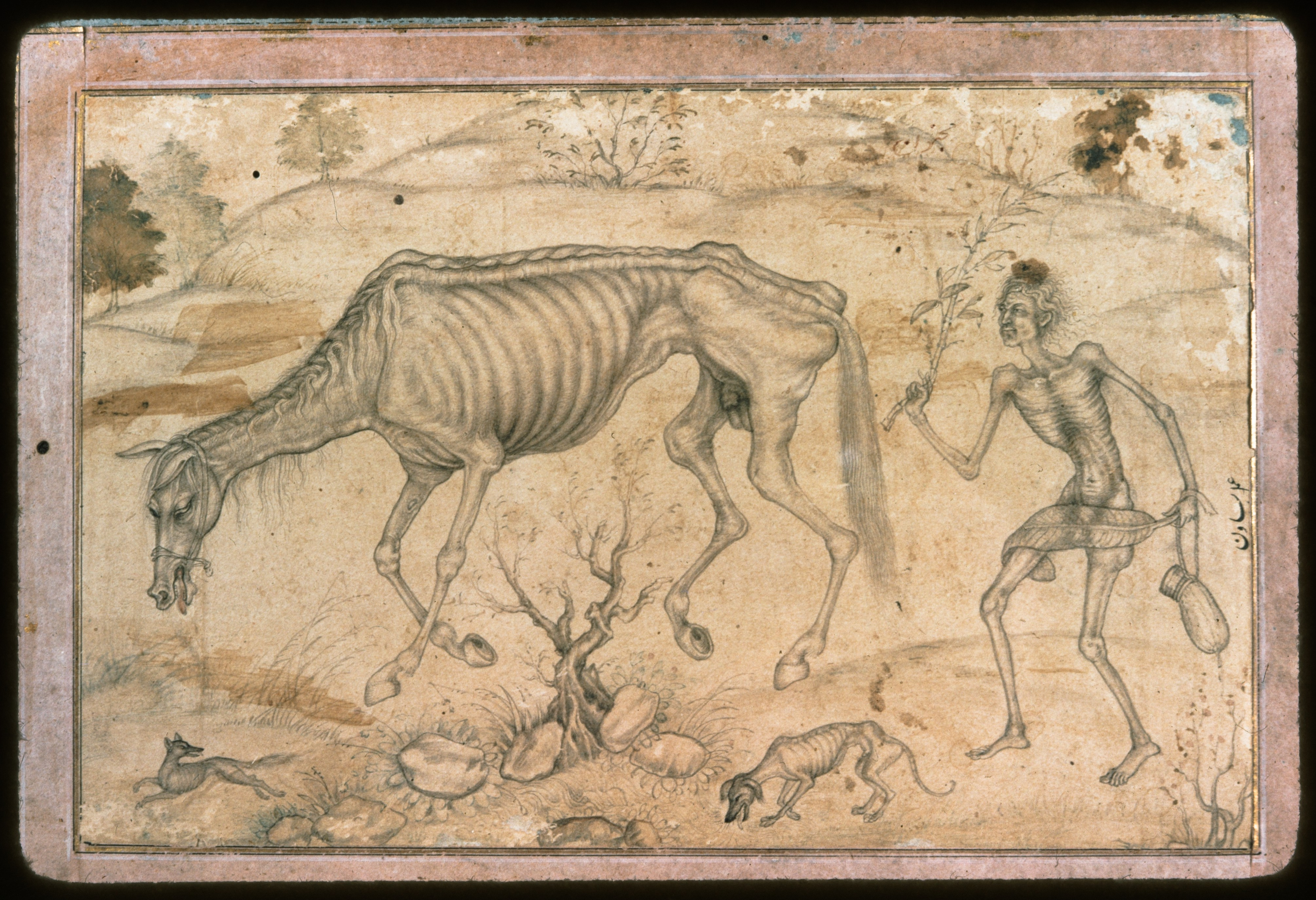
Drawing by Basawan, c. 1595

The Tughlaq Dynasty under Muhammad bin Tughluq held power during the famine centered on Delhi in 1335–1342 (which is reported to have killed thousands). Busy and faced with a difficult situation, the Tughluq couldn't properly address the famine. Pre-colonial famines in the Deccan included the Damajipant famine of 1460 and the famines starting in 1520 and 1629. The Damajipant famine is said to have caused ruin both in the northern and southern parts of the Deccan. Abd al-Qadir Badayuni claims to have witnessed cannibalism in Hindustan in a famine in 1555.

The 1629–32 famine in the Deccan and Gujarat was one of the worst in India's history. In the first 10 months of 1631 an estimated 3 million perished in Gujarat and one million in the Deccan. Eventually, the famine killed not only the poor but the rich as well. More famines hit the Deccan in 1655, 1682 and 1884. In Vikrami Samwat 1720/1663 AD, again, there was a failure of rain in the whole of Rajasthan. This year numerous people died in Marwar and the prices of the grain rose very high. The price of grain is recorded but it is not comparable with other years. Rathora-ri-khyat, no. 5, part I. The Jain traveller notes that not only prices went up but the grain was just not to be had. Cattle perished in great numbers. In 1664 the rains were normal in Rajasthan but there was a local famine in Sojhat. Not only large numbers migrated, but many were sold away as well. Gairb Das has also described about this great famine in his Amar Granth Sahib that even Princes of Delhi had to struggle for food.

According to Mushtaq A. Kaw, "Many famines were recorded in Kashmir from the sixteenth to eighteenth centuries. The Mughals and Afghan rulers in Kashmir took measures to fight them, but as the paper intends to show, their measures were too weak and in certain aspects were even worse than those of their predecessors. Contemporary sources point to a noticeable variation in the occurrence of famines over different years. They show that these famines took place on a great scale. We are told that great damage was caused to the standing crop when there was an unprecedented flood. For instance, the great flood of 1640–42 alone wiped out 438 villages in the region of Kashmir.

Some historians argue that the Mughals took a patrimonial attitude towards the peasantry that mitigated the effects of famine. Mike Davis, for example, claims that Akbar, Shah Jahan and Aurangzeb relied on tax relief, the distribution of free food without demanding labor in return, food export embargos and price controls. Abraham Eraly, on the other hand, describes these as "token and random measures, at best palliatives." In the 1630–32 famine, for example, the emperor dispersed 100,000 rupees for famine relief, a tenth of the annual "pin-money" granted his empress Mumtaz Mahal. Imperial revenue officials and local jagir amirs each granted around 7 million rupees in tax relief.

== British rule ==
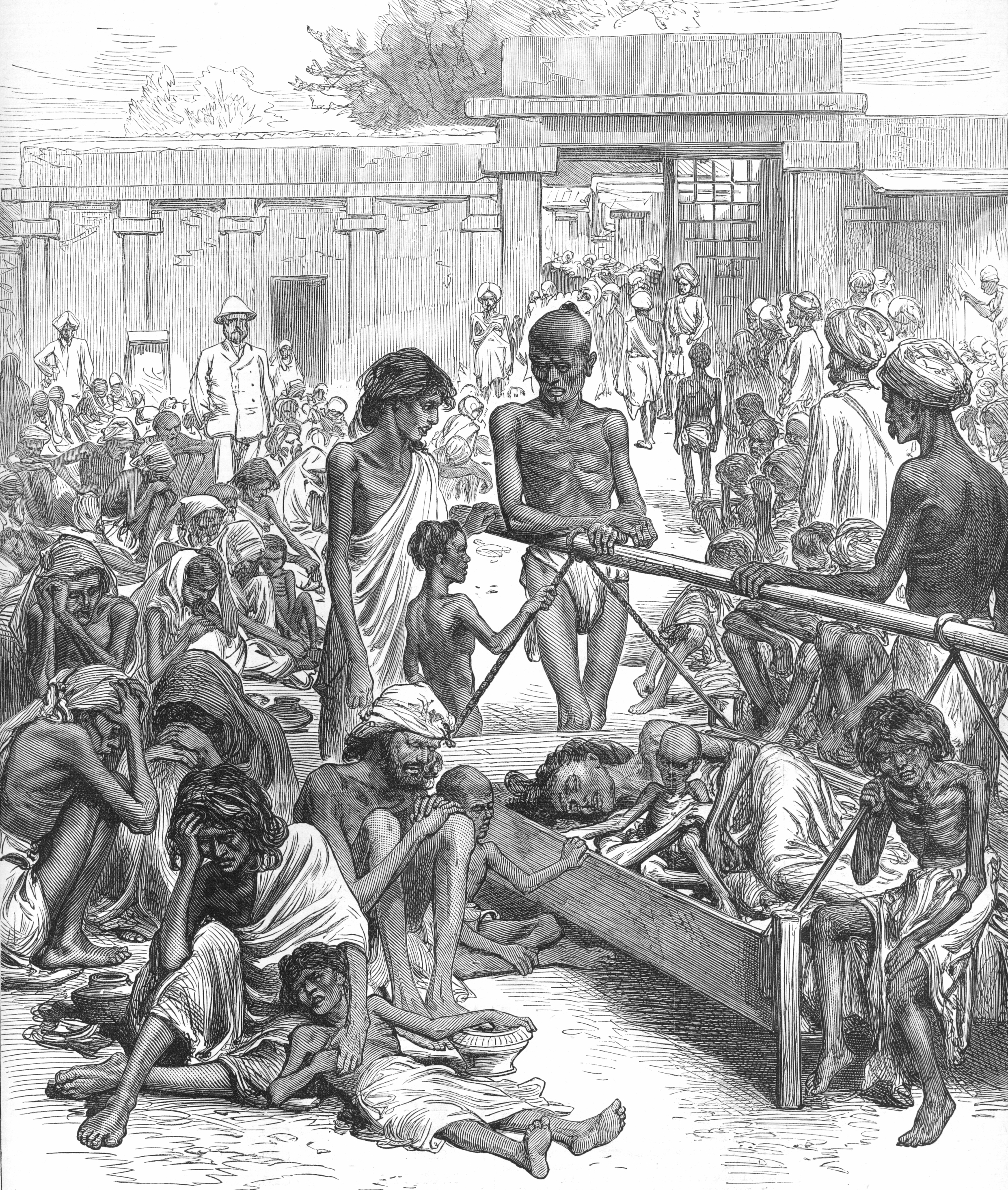
People waiting for famine relief in Bangalore. From the Illustrated London News, 20 October 1877.

The late 18th and 19th centuries saw an increase in the incidence of severe famine. (Note: "Although all of India suffered to some extent in the early eighteenth century, without question the late eighteenth and nineteenth centuries were that country's time of famines.") Approximately 15 million died from 1850 to 1899 in 24 major famines; more than in any other 50-year period. These famines in British India were severe enough to have a measurable impact on the long term population growth of the country, especially in the half-century between 1871 and 1921. The first, the Great Bengal famine of 1770, is estimated to have taken the lives of between 1 and 10 million people.

The impact of the famine caused East India Company revenues from Bengal to decline to £174,300 in 1770–71. The stock price of the East India Company fell sharply as a result. The company was forced to obtain a loan of £1 million from the Bank of England to fund the annual military budget of between £60,000–1 million. Attempts were later made to show that net revenue was unaffected by the famine, but this was possible only because the collection had been "violently kept up to its former standard". (Note: The Company was widely regarded as a pack of bloodsuckers; the Whig leader Lord Rockingham, called them guilty of "rapine and oppression" in Bengal.) The 1901 Famine Commission found that twelve famines and four "severe scarcities" took place between 1765 and 1858.

=== Indian famine ===
In the later nineteenth century there was a series of disastrous crop failures in India leading not only to starvation but to epidemics. Most were regional, but the death toll could be huge. A major famine coincided with Lord Curzon's time as viceroy which affected large parts of India and killed at least 1 million people.

Some worst British Indian Famines: 800,000 died in the North West Provinces, Punjab, and Rajasthan in 1837–1838; perhaps 2 million in the same region in 1860–1861; nearly 1 million in different areas in 1866–67; 4.3 million in widely spread areas in 1876–1878, an additional 1.2 million in the North West Provinces and Kashmir in 1877–1878; and, worst of all, over 5 million in a famine that affected a large population of India in 1896–1897. In 1899–1900 more than 1 million were thought to have died.

Researcher Brian Murton states that the famines recorded after the arrival of the English, but before the establishment of the Indian Famine Codes of the 1880s, bear a cultural bias regarding the stated causes of the famine because they "reflect the view of a handful of Englishmen." These sources, however, contain accurate recordings of weather and crop conditions. Florence Nightingale made efforts to educate British subjects about India's famines through a series of publications in the 1870s and beyond.

Florence Nightingale pointed out that the famines in British India were not caused by the lack of food in a particular geographical area. They were instead caused by inadequate transportation of food, which in turn was caused due to the absence of a political and social structure.

Nightingale identified two types of famine: a grain famine and a "money famine". Money was drained from the peasant to the landlord, making it impossible for the peasant to procure food. Money that should have been made available to the producers of food via public works projects and jobs was instead diverted to other uses. Nightingale pointed out that money needed to combat famine was being diverted towards activities like paying for the British military effort in Afghanistan in 1878–80.

Evidence suggests that there may have been large famines in south India every forty years in pre-colonial India and that the frequency might have been higher after the 12th century. These famines still did not appear to approach the incidence of famines of the 18th and 19th centuries under British rule.

=== Scholarly opinions ===
Amartya Sen, recipient of the Nobel Prize in Economics, found that the famines in the British era were not due to a lack of food but due to the inequalities in the distribution of food. He links the inequality to the undemocratic nature of the British Empire. (Note: Famines are easy to prevent if there is a serious effort to prevent them, and a government of a democratic country-facing election, criticisms from opposition parties and independent newspapers-cannot but make a serious effort to prevent famines. Not surprisingly, while India continued to have famines under British rule right up to independence (the last famine was in 1943, four years before independence, which I witnessed as a child), they disappeared suddenly, after independence, with the establishment of a multi-part democracy with a free press.)

Mike Davis regards the famines of the 1870s and 1890s as 'Late Victorian Holocausts' in which the effects of widespread weather-induced crop failures were greatly aggravated by the negligent response of the British administration. This negative image of British rule is common in India. Davis argues that "Millions died, not outside the 'modern world system', but in the very process of being forcibly incorporated into its economic and political structures. They died in the golden age of Liberal Capitalism; indeed, many were murdered ... by the theological application of the sacred principles of Smith, Bentham and Mill." However, Davis argues that since the British Raj was authoritarian and undemocratic, these famines only occurred under a system of economic liberalism, not social liberalism.

Tirthankar Roy suggests that the famines were due to environmental factors and inherent in India's ecology. (Note: 'For centuries, agriculture in the region had been characterized by dependence on monsoon rainfall, archaic techniques, and crude tillage, low intensity of inputs, subsistence farming, proneness to famines, and the low productivity of the land.') (Note: 'the prospect of a devastating famine every few years was inherent in India's ecology') Roy argues that massive investments in agriculture were required to break India's stagnation, however, these were not forthcoming owing to the scarcity of water, poor quality of soil and livestock and a poorly developed input market which guaranteed that investments in agriculture were extremely risky. After 1947, India focused on institutional reforms to agriculture. However, even this failed to break the pattern of stagnation. It wasn't until the 1970s when there was massive public investment in agriculture that India became free of famine, although Roy is of the opinion that improvements in the market efficiency did contribute to the alleviation of weather-induced famines after 1900, an exception to which is the Bengal famine of 1943.

Michelle Burge McAlpin has argued that economic changes in India during the 19th century contributed towards the end of the famine. The overwhelming subsistence agriculture economy of 19th century India gave way to a more diversified economy in the 20th century, which, by offering other forms of employment, created less agricultural disruption (and, consequently, less mortality) during times of scarcity. The construction of Indian railways between 1860 and 1920, and the opportunities thereby offered for greater profit in other markets, allowed farmers to accumulate assets that could then be drawn upon during times of scarcity. By the early 20th century, many farmers in the Bombay presidency were growing a portion of their crop for export. The railways also brought in food, whenever expected scarcities began to drive up food prices. Similarly, Donald Attwood writes that by the end of the 19th century 'local food scarcities in any given district and season were increasingly smoothed out by the invisible hand of the market and that 'By 1920, large-scale institutions integrated this region into an industrial and globalizing world-ending famine and causing a rapid decline in mortality rates, hence a rise in human welfare'.

Cormac Ó Gráda writes that colonialism did not prevent famines in India, but that those famines (and others in Ireland) were "less the product of empire per se than the failure of the authorities of the day to act appropriately." He points out that the subcontinent was free of famine between the 1900s and 1943, partly due to the railway and other improved communications, "although the shift in ideology away from hard-line Malthusianism towards a focus on saving lives also mattered." He points out that, in India as elsewhere, records of famine become much more inconsistent the further one goes back in time.

=== Causes ===
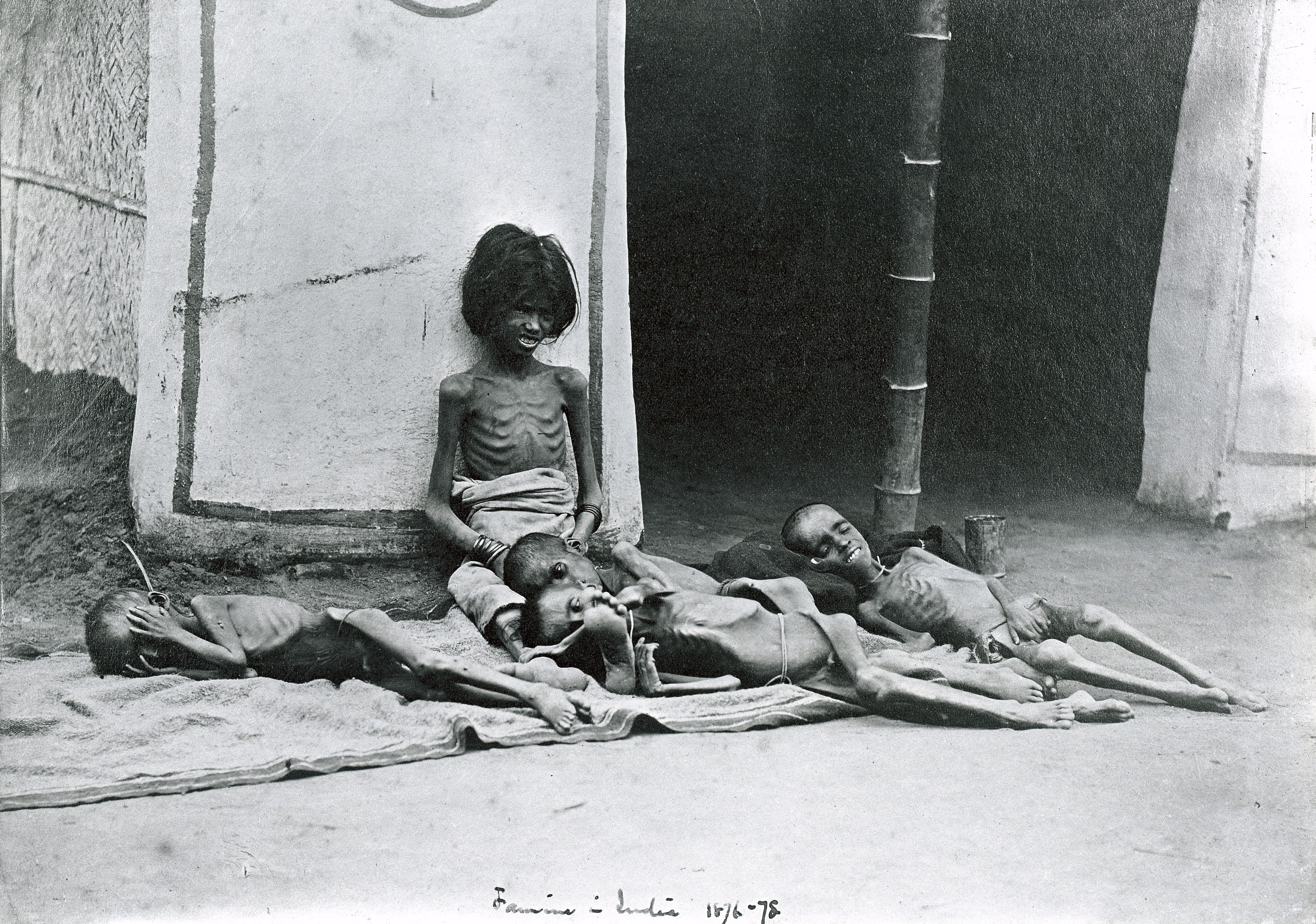
Victims of the Great Famine of 1876–1878

Many have argued that the famines were a product both of uneven rainfall and British economic and administrative policies. Colonial policies implicated include rack-renting, levies for war, free trade policies, the expansion of export agriculture, and neglect of agricultural investment. Indian exports of opium, millets, rice, wheat, indigo, jute, and cotton were a key component of the economy of the British empire, generating vital foreign currency, primarily from China, and stabilising low prices in the British grain market. According to Mike Davis, export crops displaced millions of acres that could have been used for domestic subsistence and increased the vulnerability of Indians to food crises. Martin Ravallion disputes that exports were a major cause of the famine, pointing out that trade did have a stabilizing influence on India's food consumption, albeit a small one.

The Odisha famine of 1866–1867, which later spread through the Madras Presidency to Hyderabad and Mysore, was one such famine. The famine of 1866 was a severe and terrible event in the history of Odisha in which about a third of the population died. The famine left an estimated 1,553 orphans whose guardians were to receive an amount of 3 rupees per month until the age of 17 for boys and 16 for girls. Similar famines followed in the western Ganges region, Rajasthan, central India (1868–1870), Bengal and eastern India (1873–1874), Deccan (1876–78), and again in the Ganges region, Madras, Hyderabad, Mysore, and Bombay (1876–1878). The famine of 1876–1878, also known as the Great Famine of 1876–1878, caused a large migration of agricultural laborers and artisans from southern India to British tropical colonies, where they worked as indentured labourers on plantations. The large death toll—between 5.6 and 10.3 million—offset the usual population growth in the Bombay and Madras Presidencies between the first and second censuses of British India in 1871 and 1881 respectively.

The large-scale loss of life due to the series of famines between 1860 and 1877 was the cause of political controversy and discussion which led to the formation of the Indian Famine Commission. This commission would later come up with a draft version of the Indian Famine Code. It was the Great Famine of 1876–1878, however, that was the direct cause of investigations and the beginning of a process that led to the establishment of the Indian Famine code. The next major famine was the Indian famine of 1896–1897. Although this famine was preceded by a drought in the Madras Presidency, it was made more acute by the government's policy of laissez faire in the trade of grain. For example, two of the worst famine-afflicted areas in the Madras Presidency, the districts of Ganjam and Vizagapatam, continued to export grains throughout the famine. These famines were typically followed by various infectious diseases such as bubonic plague and influenza, which attacked and killed a population already weakened by starvation.

=== British response ===
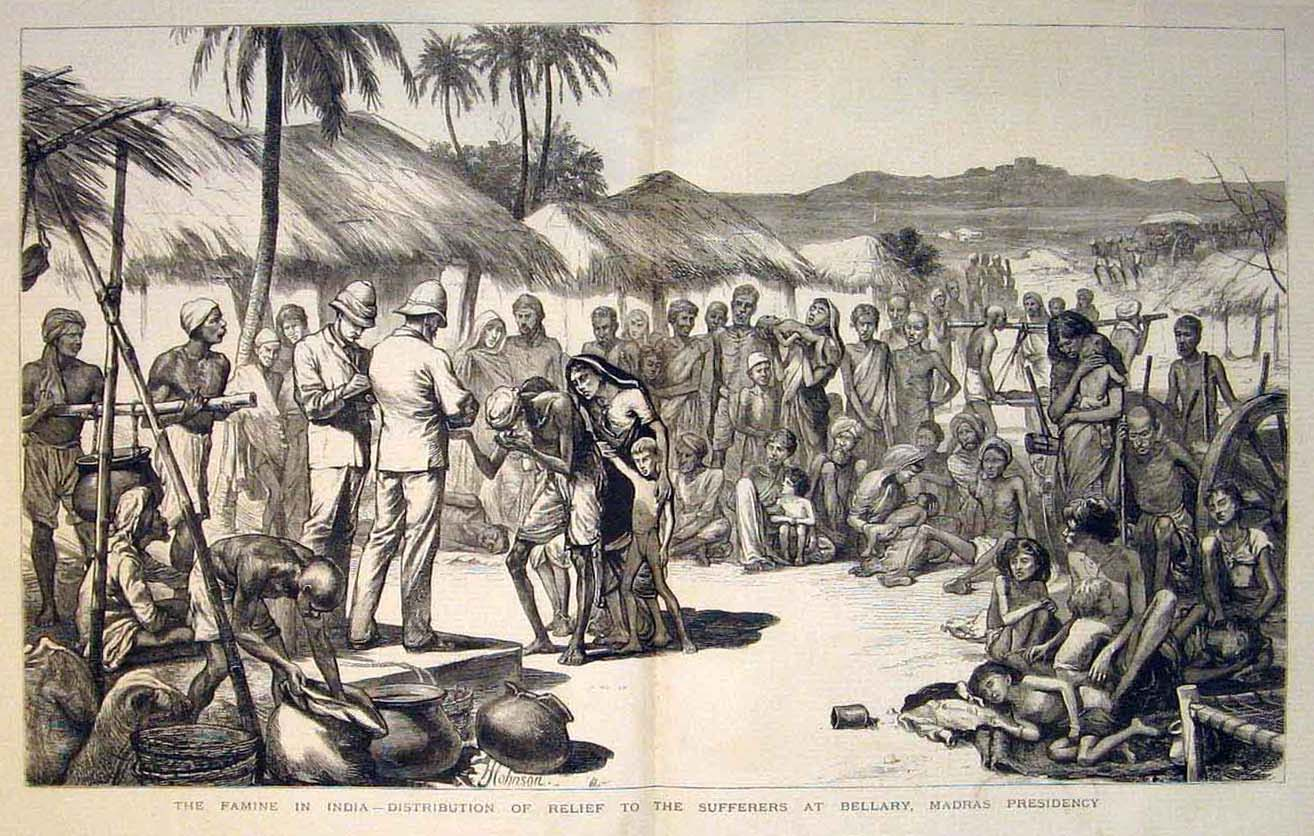
A contemporary print of the Madras famine of 1877 showing the distribution of relief in Bellary, Madras Presidency. From the Illustrated London News, (1877)

The first major famine that took place under East India Company's rule was the Bengal Famine of 1770. About a quarter to a third of the population of Bengal starved to death in about a ten-month period. East India Company's raising of taxes disastrously coincided with this famine and exacerbated it, even if the famine was not caused by the British colonial government. Following this famine, "Successive British governments were anxious not to add to the burden of taxation." The rains failed again in Bengal and Odisha in 1866. Policies of laissez faire were employed, which resulted in partial alleviation of the famine in Bengal. However, the southwest Monsoon made the harbor in Odisha inaccessible. As a result, food could not be imported into Odisha as easily as Bengal. In 1865–66, a severe drought struck Odisha and was met by British official inaction. The British Secretary of State for India, Lord Salisbury, did nothing for two months, by which time a million people had died, which he later regretted. (Note: "I did nothing for two months. Before that time the monsoon had closed the ports of Orissa-help was impossible—and—it is said—a million people died. The Governments of India and Bengal had taken in effect no precautions whatever… I never could feel that I was free from all blame for the result." —The British Secretary of State for India, Lord Salisbury.)

Some prominent British citizens such as William Digby agitated for policy reforms and famine relief, but Lord Lytton, the governing British viceroy in India, opposed such changes in the belief that they would stimulate shirking by Indian workers. Reacting against calls for relief during the 1877–79 famine, Lytton replied, "Let the British public foot the bill for its 'cheap sentiment,' if it wished to save life at a cost that would bankrupt India," substantively ordering "there is to be no interference of any kind on the part of Government with the object of reducing the price of food," and instructing district officers to "discourage relief works in every possible way… Mere distress is not a sufficient reason for opening a relief work." The Lt.-Governor of Bengal, Sir Richard Temple, successfully intervened in the Bihar famine of 1874 with little to no mortality; this is the only known example of adequate measures meeting a food crisis by the British. Temple was criticized by many British officials for spending too much on famine relief.

Then in 1876, a large-scale famine broke out in Madras. Lord Lytton's administration believed that 'market forces alone would suffice to feed the starving Indians.' (Note: In the despatch addressed to the Duke of Buckingham, in which the Viceroy announced his intention of visiting the famine districts of Madras and Mysore, the general principles for the management of famine affairs were once more laid down. After stating that the Government of India, with approval of Her Majesty's Government, were resolved to avert death by starvation by the employment of all means available, the Viceroy first expressed his conviction that 'absolute non-interference with the operations of the private commercial enterprise must be the foundation of their present famine policy.' This was based on the belief that 'free and abundant trade cannot co-exist with Government importation' and that more food will reach the famine-stricken districts if private enterprise is left to itself (beyond receiving every possible facility and information from the government) than if it were paralyzed by Government competition.) The Great Famine of 1876–1878 killed at least 5.6 million people, so this policy was abandoned. Lord Lytton established the Famine Insurance Grant, a system in which, in times of financial surplus, INR 1,500,000 would be applied to famine relief works. The result was that the British prematurely assumed that the problem of famine had been solved forever and future British viceroys became complacent. During the Indian famine of 1896–1897, between 1.25 and 10 million people died. About 4.5 million people were on famine relief at the peak of the famine.

Curzon has been criticised by Mike Davis for his response to the Indian famine of 1899–1900. (Note: David Gilmour's Curzon and Ruling Caste. In Curzon he writes that 3.5 million were on famine relief, in Ruling Caste he writes it was over five million.) Davis points to Curzon having stated that "any government which imperilled the financial position of India in the interests of prodigal philanthropy would be open to serious criticism; but any government which by indiscriminate alms-giving weakened the fibre and demoralized the self-reliance of the population, would be guilty of a public crime." Davis also writes that Curzon cut back rations characterized by Curzon as "dangerously high" and stiffened relief eligibility by reinstating the Temple tests.

After famine of 1899–1900, Lord Curzon appointed a commission under the leadership of Anthony McDonnel, which suggested that:

- By acknowledging moral responsibility, the government should launch relief measures,
- The code on famine should be revised,
- There should be no delay in providing food grains and other assistance,
- A Commissioner for famine should be appointed,
- Irrigation facilities should be developed,
- an agriculture bank should be set up to provide people with assistance.

=== Policy influences ===
British famine policy in India was influenced by the arguments of Adam Smith, as seen by the non-interference of the government with the grain market even in times of famines. Keeping the famine relief as cheap as possible, with minimum cost to the colonial exchequer, was another important factor in determining famine policy. According to Brian Murton, a professor of geography at the University of Hawaii, another possible impact on British policy on famine in India was the influence of the English Poor Laws of 1834, with the difference being that the English were willing to "maintain" the poor in England in normal times, whereas Indians would receive subsistence only when entire populations were endangered. Similarities between the Irish famine of 1846–49 and the later Indian famines of the last part of the 19th century were seen. In both countries, there were no impediments to the export of food during times of famines. Lessons learnt from the Irish famine were not seen in the correspondence on policy-making during the 1870s in India.

=== Famine Codes ===
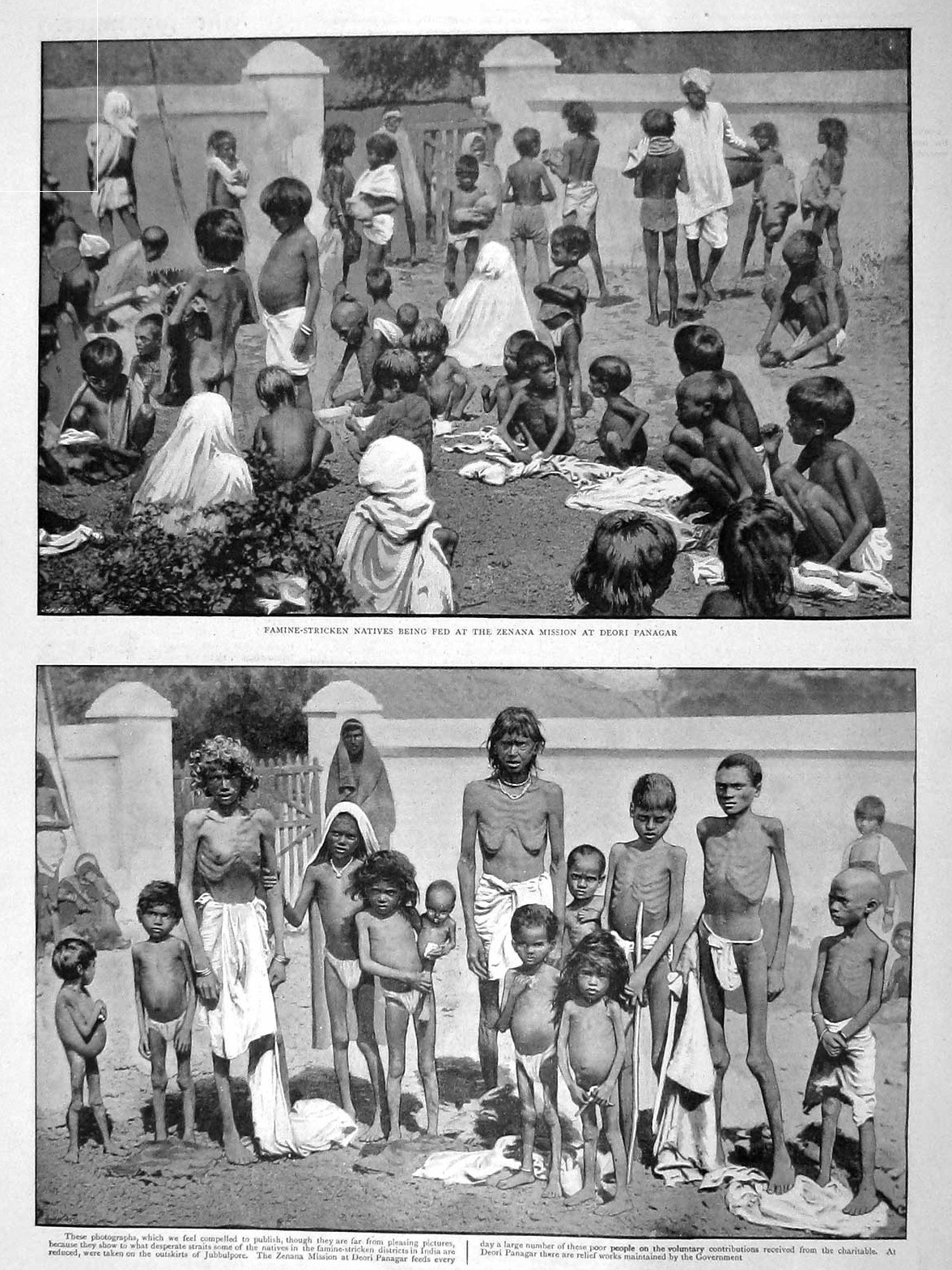
Victims of the Indian famine of 1896–1897 in Jabalpur

The Famine Commission of 1880 observed that each province in British India, including Burma, had a surplus of food grains and that the annual surplus amounted to 5.16 million metric tons. The product of the Famine Commission was a series of government guidelines and regulations on how to respond to famines and food shortages called the Famine Code. These had to wait until the exit of Lord Lytton as viceroy and were finally passed in 1883 under a subsequent more liberal-minded viceroy, Lord Ripon. They presented an early warning system to detect and respond to food shortages. Despite the codes, mortality from famine was highest in the last 25 years of the 19th century. At that time, annual exports of rice and other grains from India was approximately one million metric tons. Development economist Jean Drèze evaluated the conditions before and after Famine Commission policy changes: "A contrast between the earlier period of frequently recurring catastrophes, and the latter period when long stretches of tranquility were disturbed by a few large scale famines" in 1896–97, 1899–1900, and 1943–44. Drèze explains these "intermittent failures" by four factors—failure to declare a famine (particularly in 1943), the "excessively punitive character" of famine restrictions such as wages for public works, the "policy of strict non-interference with private trade," and the natural severity of the food crises.

There was still a threat of famine, but after 1902 there was no major famine in India until the Bengal famine of 1943 during World War II. This famine killed between 2.5 and 3 million people. In India as a whole, the food supply was rarely inadequate, even in times of droughts. The Famine Commission of 1880 identified that the loss of wages from lack of employment of agricultural laborers and artisans was the cause of famines. The Famine Code applied a strategy of generating employment for these sections of the population and relied on open-ended public works to do so. The Indian Famine Code was used in India until more lessons were learned from the Bihar famine of 1966–1967. The Famine Code has been updated in independent India and it has been renamed "Scarcity Manuals". In some parts of the country, the Famine Code is no longer used, primarily because the rules embodied in them have become routine procedures in famine relief strategy.

=== Impact of rail transport ===
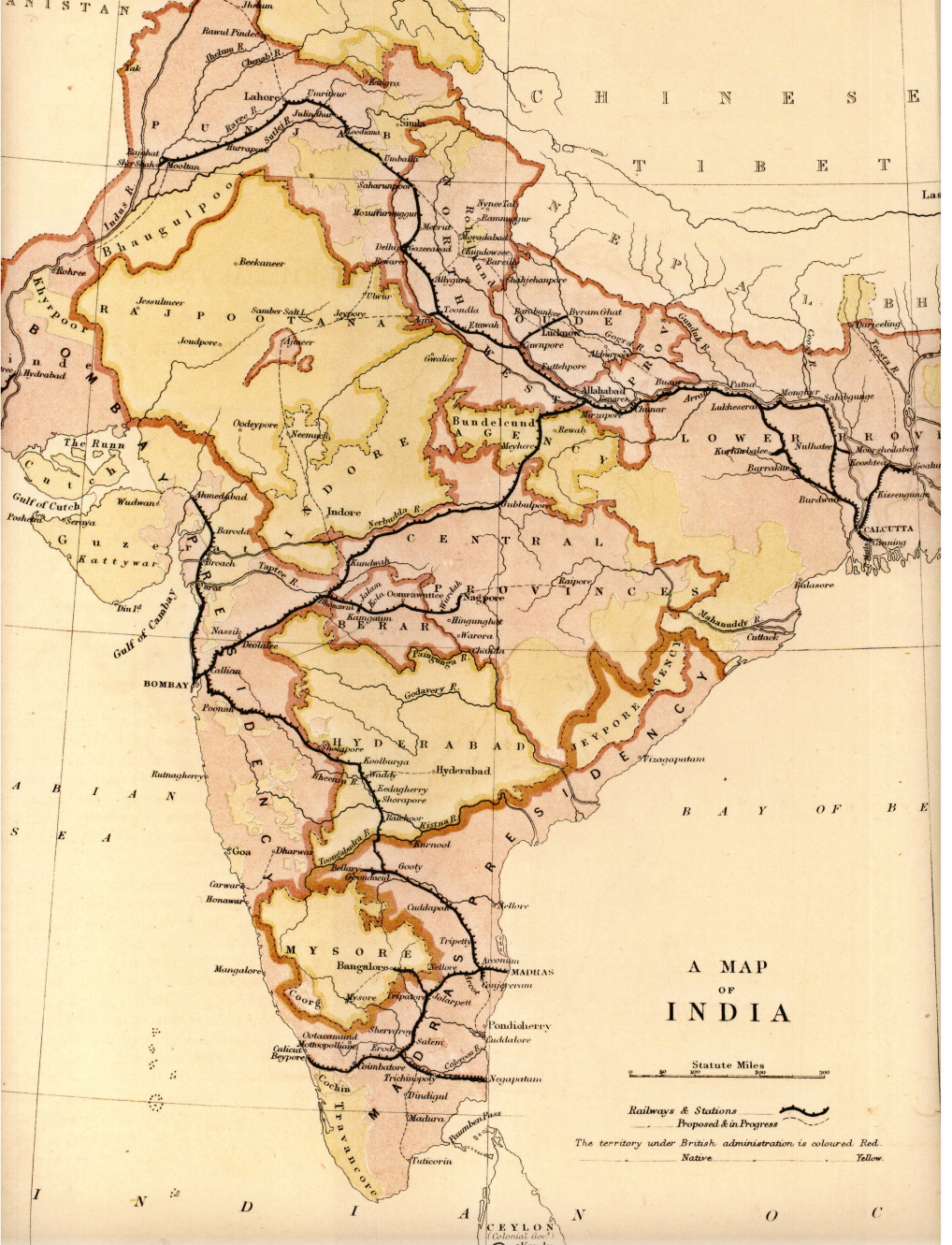
Railway network on the eve of the worst famines in Indian history in 1870s

The failure to provide food to the millions who were hungry during the famines of the 1870s has been blamed both on the absence of adequate rail infrastructure and the incorporation of grain into the world market through rail and telegraph. Davis notes that, "The newly constructed railways, lauded as institutional safeguards against famine, were instead used by merchants to ship grain inventories from outlying drought-stricken districts to central depots for hoarding (as well as protection from rioters)" and that telegraphs served to coordinate a rise in prices so that "food prices soared out of the reach of outcaste laborers, displaced weavers, sharecroppers, and poor peasants." Members of the British administrative apparatus were also concerned that the larger market created by railway transport encouraged poor peasants to sell off their reserve stocks of grain.

Rail transport, however, also played an essential role in supplying grain from food-surplus regions to famine-stricken ones. The 1880 Famine Codes urged a restructuring and massive expansion of railways, with an emphasis on intra-Indian lines as opposed to the existing port-centered system. These new lines extended the existing network to allow food to flow to famine-afflicted regions. Jean Drèze (1991) also finds that the necessary economic conditions were present for a national market in food to reduce scarcity by the end of the 19th century, but that export of food continued to result from that market even during times of relative scarcity. The effectiveness of this system, however, relied on government provision of famine relief: "Railroads could perform the crucial task of moving grain from one part of India to another, but they could not assure that hungry people would have the money to buy that grain".

A famine weakens body resistance and leads to increases in infectious diseases, especially cholera, dysentery, malaria, and smallpox. Human response to famine could spread the disease as people migrated in search of food and work. On the other hand, railways also had a separate impact on reducing famine mortality by taking people to areas where food was available, or even out of India. By generating broader areas of labor migration and facilitating the massive emigration of Indians during the late 19th century, they provided famine-afflicted people the option to leave for other parts of the country and the world. By the 1912–13 scarcity crisis, migration and relief supply were able to absorb the impact of a medium-scale shortage of food. Drèze concludes, "In sum, and with a major reservation applying to international trade, it is plausible that the improvement in communication towards the end of the nineteenth century did make a major contribution to the alleviation of distress during famines. However, it is also easy to see that this factor alone could hardly account for the very sharp reduction in the incidence of famines in the twentieth century".

=== Bengal famine of 1943 ===
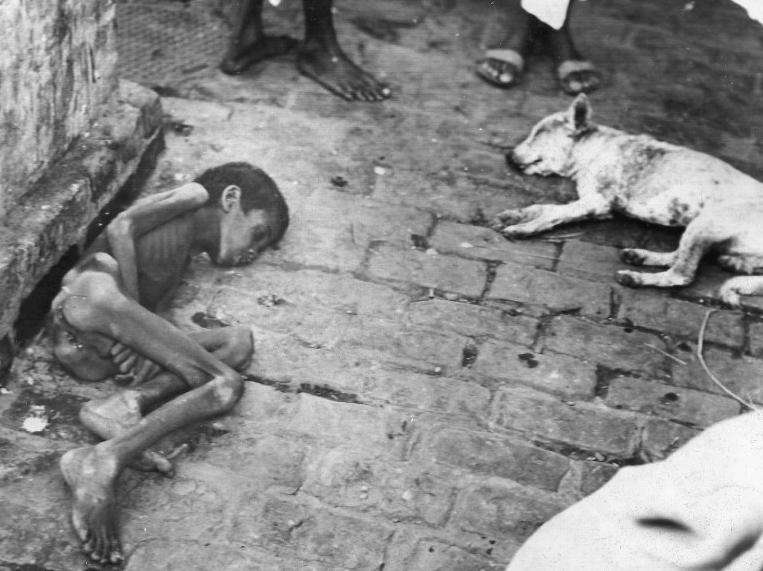
Child who starved to death during the Bengal famine of 1943

The Bengal famine of 1943 reached its peak between July and November of that year, and the worst of the famine was over by early 1945. Famine fatality statistics were unreliable, and it is estimated up to two million died. Although one of the causes of the famine was the cutting off of the supply of rice to Bengal during the fall of Rangoon to the Japanese, this was only a fraction of the food needed for the region. According to the Irish economist and professor Cormac Ó Gráda, priority was given to military considerations, and the poor of Bengal were left unprovided for. However, it should be emphasized that food was the responsibility of the elected Government of Bengal and that it was the Army which helped break the Famine. Attempts were made by the Government of India to direct food from surplus regions such as Punjab to famine areas in Bengal but the provincial governments obstructed the movement of grain. The Famine Commission of 1944–45 admitted that the poor harvest had reduced supply of food till the end of 1943. Economist Amartya Sen found that there was enough rice in Bengal to feed all of Bengal for most of 1943 but his figures have been questioned. Sen claimed the famine was caused by inflation, with those benefiting from inflation eating more and leaving less for the rest of the population. The Famine Commission Report does not make this claim. It says that indigents and those in service occupations in villages starved because producers preferred to keep or sell rice at a high price. These studies, however, did not account for possible inaccuracies in estimates or the impact of fungal disease on the rice. De Waal states that the British government – which was in fact constituted by elected Bengali politicians – did not enforce the Famine Codes during the Bengal famine of 1943 because they failed to detect a food shortage. The Bengal famine of 1943 was the last catastrophic famine in India, and it holds a special place in the historiography of famine due to Sen's classic work of 1981 titled Poverty and Famines: An Essay on Entitlement and Deprivation whose accuracy and analysis has however been hotly contested by experts in the field.

This famine led to the development of the Bengal Famine Mixture (based on rice with sugar). This would later save tens of thousands of lives at liberated concentration camps such as Belsen.

== Republic of India ==
Since the Bengal famine of 1943, there has been a declining number of famines that have had limited effects and have been of short durations. Sen attributes this trend of decline or disappearance of famines after independence to a democratic system of governance and a free press—not to increased food production. Later famine threats of 1984, 1988, and 1998 were successfully contained by the Indian government and there has been no major famine in India since 1943. Indian Independence in 1947 did not stop damage to crops nor lack of rain. As such, the threat of famines did not go away. India faced a number of threats of severe famines in 1967, 1973, 1979, and 1987 in Bihar, Maharashtra, West Bengal, and Gujarat respectively. However, these did not materialize into famines due to government intervention. The loss of life did not meet the scale of the 1943 Bengal or earlier famines but continued to be a problem. Jean Drèze finds that the post-Independence Indian government "largely remedied" the causes of the three major failures of 1880–1948 British famine policy, "an event which must count as marking the second great turning point in the history of famine relief in India over the past two centuries".

A drought occurred in the state of Bihar in December 1966 on a much smaller scale and in which "Happily, aid was at hand and there were relatively fewer deaths". The drought of Maharashtra in 1970–73 is often cited as an example in which successful famine prevention processes were employed. (Note: "India's great 'success story' of famine prevention is more justly dated in 1972–73, when another very severe drought hit large parts of the country. The worst affected state was that of Maharashtra…")

Outside of India, there have been major famines in areas formerly part of British India. The Bangladesh famine of 1974, lasting from March to December, killed up to 1.5 million people, including post-famine mortality from disease.

In 2016–18, 194 million of 810 million undernourished people globally lived in India, making the country a key focus for tackling hunger on a global scale. In the last two decades, per capita income more than tripled, yet the minimum dietary intake fell.

=== Infrastructure development ===
Deaths from starvation were reduced by improvements to famine relief mechanisms after the British left. In independent India, policy changes aimed to make people self-reliant to earn their livelihood and by providing food through the public distribution system at discounted rates. Between 1947 and 1964 the initial agricultural infrastructure was laid by the founding of organizations such as National Rice Research Institute in Cuttack, Central Potato Research Institute in Shimla, and universities such as the G. B. Pant University of Agriculture and Technology. The population of India was growing at 3% per year, and food imports were required despite the improvements from the new infrastructure. At its peak, 10 million tonnes of food were imported from United States.

In the twenty-year period between 1965 and 1985 gaps in infrastructure were bridged by the establishment of The National Bank for Agriculture and Rural Development (NABARD). During times of famines, droughts, and other natural calamities, NABARD provides loan rescheduling and loan conversion facilitates to eligible institutions such as State Cooperative banks and Regional Rural Banks for periods up to seven years. In the same period, high-yielding varieties of wheat and rice were introduced. Steps taken in this phase resulted in the Green Revolution which led to a mood of self-confidence in India's agricultural capability. The Green Revolution in India was initially hailed as a success, but has recently been 'downgraded' to a 'qualified success'—not because of a lack of increased food production, but because the increase in food production has slowed down and has not been able to keep pace with population growth. Between 1985 and 2000, the emphasis was laid on the production of millets, pulses, and oilseed, as well as vegetables, fruits, and milk. A wasteland development board was set up, and rain-fed areas were given more attention. Public investment in irrigation and infrastructure, however, declined. The period also saw a gradual collapse of the cooperative credit system. In 1998–99, NABARD introduced a credit scheme to allow banks to issue short-term and timely credit to farmers in need via the Kisan Credit Card scheme. The scheme has become popular among issuing bankers and the recipient farmers with a total credit of ₹339.94 billion (US$3.5 billion) made available via the issuing of 23,200,000 credit cards as of November 2002. Between 2000 and present day, land use for food or fuel has become a competing issue due to a demand for ethanol.

=== Local beliefs ===
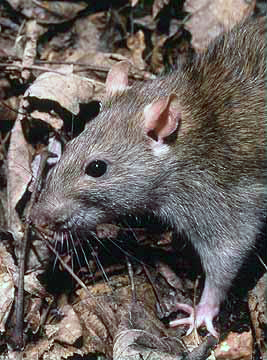
The rodent genera Rattus and Mus are a part of the mechanism that causes a decline in food availability in northeastern India

Since the time of Mahabharata, people in several regions of India have associated spikes in rat populations and famine with bamboo flowering. The northeastern state of Mizoram has bamboo as a dominant species over much of the state which experiences a cyclical phenomenon of bamboo flowering followed by bamboo death. The bamboo plants are known to undergo gregarious flowering once in their life cycle which can happen anywhere in a range of 7 to 120 years. A common local belief and observation is that bamboo flowering is followed by an increase in rats, famine, and unrest amongst the people. This is called mautam. The first such event in the Republic of India was reported in 1958 when the local Mizo District Council cautioned the Government of Assam of an impending famine which the government rejected on the grounds that it was not scientific. A famine did occur in the region in 1961.

In 2001 the Government of India began working on an emergency plan to address regional food shortages after reports that bamboo flowering and bamboo death would occur again in the near future. According to Forest Department Special Secretary K.D.R. Jayakumar, the relationship between famine and bamboo flowering, while widely believed to be true by the tribal locals, has not been scientifically proven. John and Nadgauda, however, strongly feel that such a scientific connection exists and that it may not simply be a local myth. They describe a detailed mechanism demonstrating the relationship between the flowering and the famine. According to them, the flowering is followed by a large number of bamboo seeds on the forest floor which causes a spike in the population of the rodent genera Rattus and Mouse who feed on these seeds. With the changing weather and onset of rains, the seeds germinate and force the mice to migrate to land farms in search of food. On the land farms, the mice feed on crops and grains stored in granaries which causes a decline in food availability. In 2001, the local administration tried to prevent the impending famine by offering local villagers the equivalent of $2.50 for every 100 rats killed. The botanist H.Y. Mohan Ram of the Delhi University, who is one of the country's foremost authorities on bamboo, considered these techniques outlandish. He suggested that a better way of solving the problem was to teach the local farmers to switch to cultivating different varieties of crops such as ginger and turmeric during periods of bamboo flowering since these crops are not consumed by the rats.

Similar beliefs have been observed in south India in the people of Cherthala in the Alappuzha district of Kerala who associate flowering bamboo with an impending explosion in the rat population.

=== 1966–1967 West Bengal food crisis (famine) ===
The 1966–1967 food crisis in West Bengal was a period of severe food scarcity and civil unrest triggered by consecutive monsoon failures, resulting in major agricultural deficits and hyperinflation of essential grains. The crisis led to the widespread "Food Movements," where peasants, student groups, and leftist political parties protested to demand basic food rations and kerosene. The state government responded to the demonstrations with police force, which included instances of police firing that resulted in fatalities among the protestors. Controversy remains surrounding the official death toll of the crisis. While the Government of India officially acknowledged fewer than 3,000 starvation-related deaths nationally—often classifying casualties under malnutrition or disease—contemporary critics and independent political analysts accused authorities of deliberately suppressing information and underreporting data to hide the true scale of the tragedy. Independent historical estimates place the actual toll from starvation, associated epidemics, and state crackdowns at more than 20,000 deaths.

=== Bihar drought ===
The Bihar drought of 1966–1967 was a minor drought with relatively very few deaths from starvation as compared to earlier famines. The drought demonstrated the ability of the Indian government to deal with the worst of drought-related circumstances. The official death toll from starvation in the Bihar drought was 2353, roughly half of which occurred in Bihar. No significant increase in the number of infant deaths from famine was found in the Bihar drought.

The annual production of food grains had dropped in Bihar from 7.5 million tonnes in 1965–1966 to 7.2 million tonnes in 1966–1967 during the Bihar drought. There was an even sharper drop in 1966–67 to 4.3 million tonnes. The national grain production dropped from 89.4 million tonnes in 1964–1965 to 72.3 in 1965–1966 — a 19% drop. The rise in prices of food grains caused migration and starvation, but the public distribution system, relief measures by the government, and voluntary organizations limited the impact. On a number of occasions, the Indian-government sought food and grain from the United States to provide replacement for damaged crops, however US food aid was limited by Lyndon B. Johnson in retaliation for Indian criticism on the US's role in the Vietnam War. The government set up more than 20,000 fair-price stores to provide food at regulated prices for the poor or those with limited incomes. A large-scale famine in Bihar was averted due to this import, although livestock and crops were destroyed. Other reasons for successfully averting a large-scale drought were employing various drought prevention measures such as improving communication abilities, issuing drought bulletins over the radio, and offering employment to those affected by drought in government public works projects.

The Bihar drought of 1966–1967 gave impetus to further changes in agricultural policy and this resulted in the Green Revolution.

=== 1972 Maharashtra drought ===
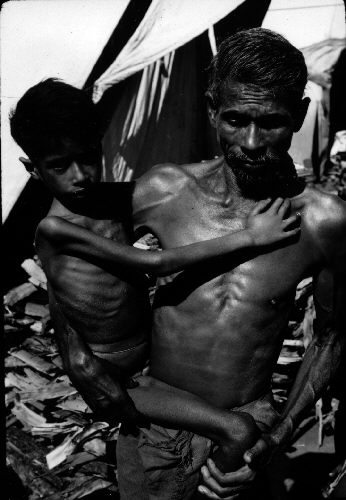
A child suffering extreme starvation in India in 1972

After several years of good monsoons and a good crop in the early 1970s, India considered exporting food and being self-sufficient. Earlier in 1963, the government of the state of Maharashtra asserted that the agricultural situation in the state was constantly being watched and relief measures were taken as soon as any scarcity was detected. On the basis of this, and asserting that the word famine had now become obsolete in this context, the government passed "The Maharashtra Deletion of the Term 'Famine' Act, 1963". They were unable to foresee the drought in 1972 when 25 million people needed help. The relief measures undertaken by the Government of Maharashtra included employment, programs aimed at creating productive assets such as tree plantation, conservation of soil, excavation of canals, and building artificial lentic water bodies. The public distribution system distributed food through fair-price shops. No deaths from starvation were reported.

Large-scale employment to the deprived sections of the Maharashtrian society attracted considerable amounts of food to Maharashtra. The implementation of the Scarcity Manuals in the Bihar and Maharashtra famines prevented the mortality arising from severe food shortages. While the relief program in Bihar was poor, Drèze calls the one in Maharashtra a model program. The relief works initiated by the government helped employ over 5 million people at the height of the drought in Maharashtra leading to effective famine prevention. The effectiveness of Maharashtra was also attributable to the direct pressure on the government of Maharashtra by the public who perceived that employment via the relief works program was their right. The public protested by marching, picketing, and even rioting. Drèze reports a laborer saying "they would let us die if they thought we would not make a noise about it."

The Maharashtra drought in which there were zero deaths and one which is known for the successful employment of famine prevention policies.

=== West Bengal drought ===
The drought of 1979–1980 in West Bengal was the next major drought and caused a 17% decline in food production with a shortfall of 13.5 million tonnes of food grain. Stored food stocks were leveraged by the government, and there was no net import of food grains. The drought was relatively unknown outside of India. The lessons learned from the Maharashtra and West Bengal droughts led to the Desert Development Programme and the Drought Prone Area Programme. The intent of these programs was to reduce the negative effects of droughts by applying eco-friendly land-use practices and conserving water. Major schemes in improving rural infrastructure, extending irrigation to additional areas, and diversifying agriculture were also launched. The lessons from the 1987 drought brought to light the need for employment generation, watershed planning, and ecologically integrated development.

=== 1987 Gujarat drought ===
The failure of monsoons in year 1987 had catastrophic consequences for India state of Gujarat. 16 out of the state's 19 districts were affected by severe drought. There was a severe economic crisis in the Saurashtra region, with groundnut mills closing and agriculture being deeply impacted.

=== 2013 Maharashtra drought ===
In March 2013, according to Union Agriculture Ministry, over 11,801 villages in Maharashtra were declared drought affected. The drought was considered the second worst to date, exceeded only by the drought in Maharashtra in 1972.

=== Other issues ===
Deaths from malnutrition on a large scale have continued across India into modern times. In Maharashtra alone, for example, there were around 45,000 childhood deaths due to mild or severe malnutrition in 2009, according to the Times of India. Another Times of India report in 2010 has stated that 50% of childhood deaths in India are attributable to malnutrition.

Growing export prices, the melting of the Himalayan glaciers due to global warming, changes in rainfall, and temperatures are issues affecting India. If agricultural production does not remain above the population growth rate, there are indications that a return to the pre-independence famine days is a likelihood. People from various walks of life, such as social activist Vandana Shiva and researcher Dan Banik, agree that famines and the resulting large-scale loss of life from starvation have been eliminated after Indian independence in 1947. (Note: There has not been a large-scale loss of life since 1947.) However, Shiva warned in 2002 that famines are making a comeback and government inaction would mean they would reach the scale seen in the Horn of Africa in three or four years.

== Gallery ==
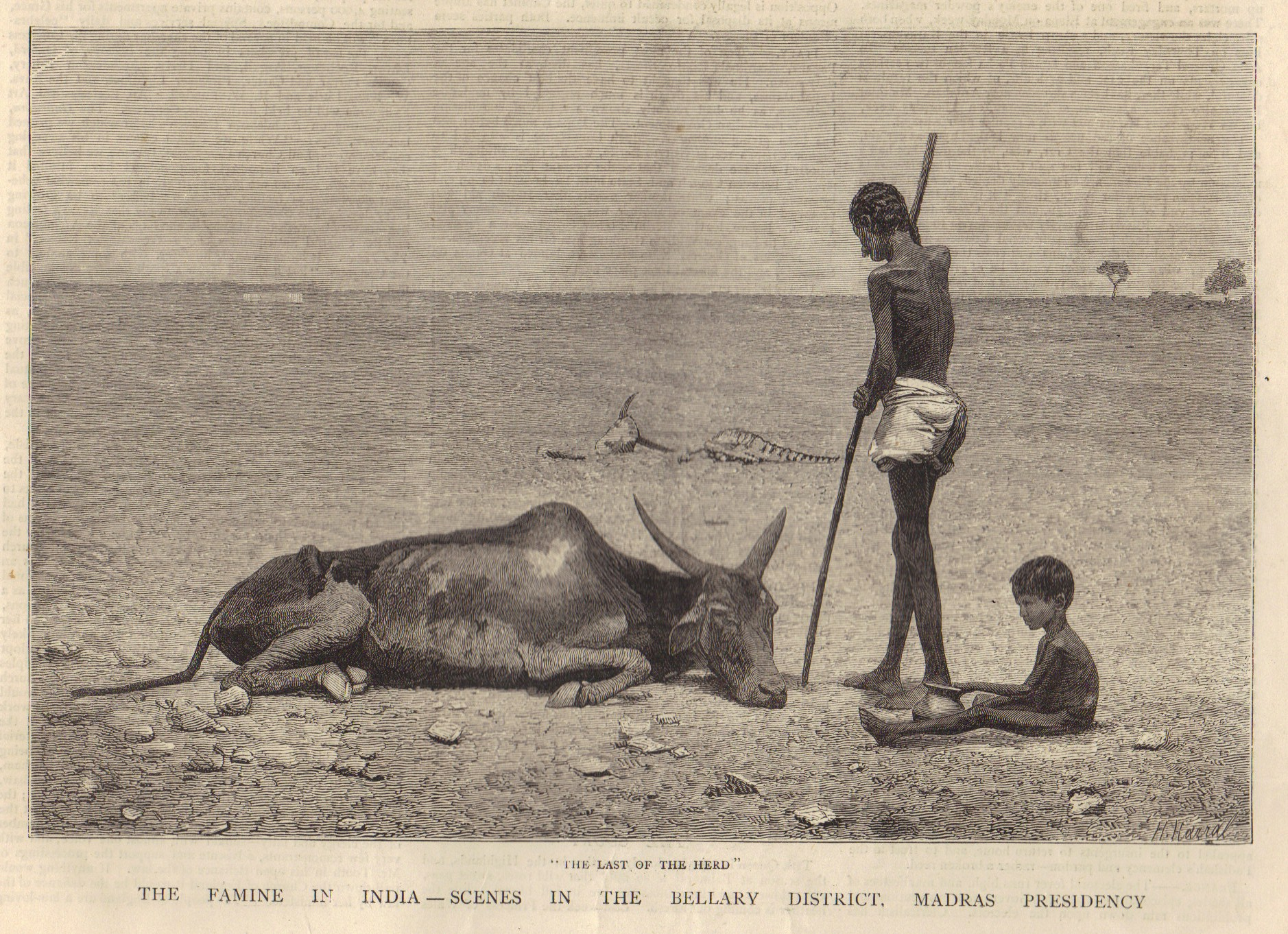
Great Famine of 1876–78 in Bellary.

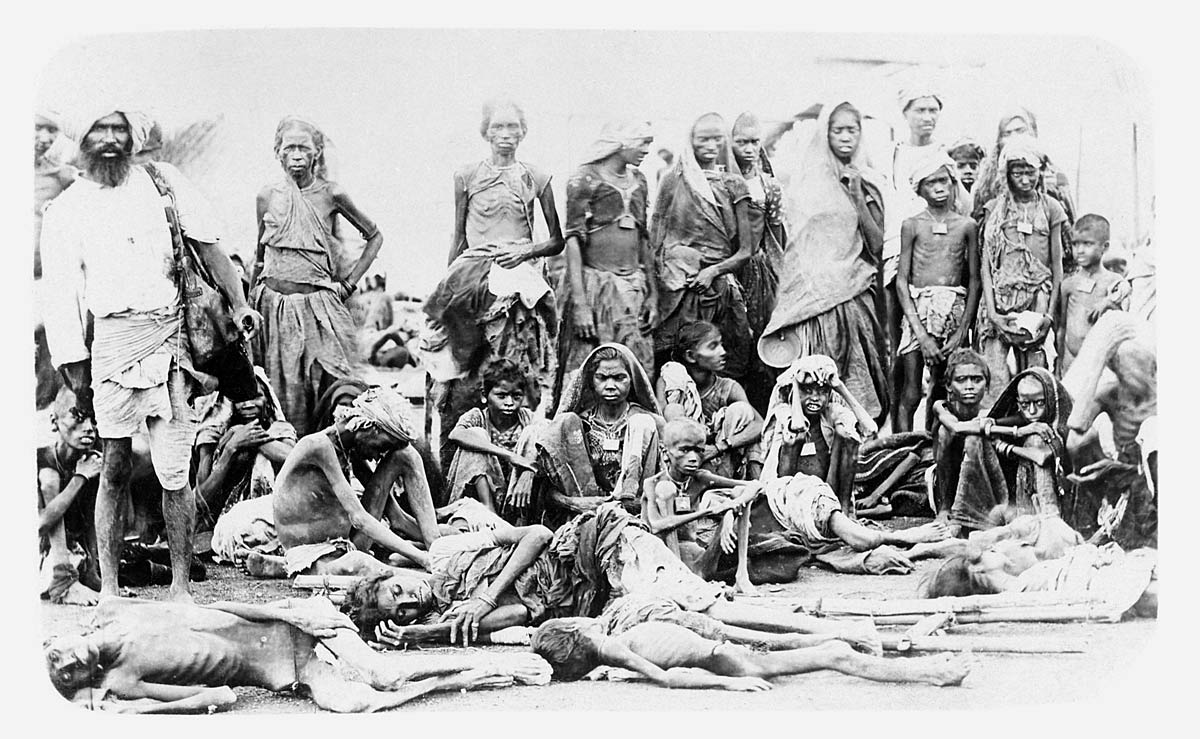
Famine victims in India

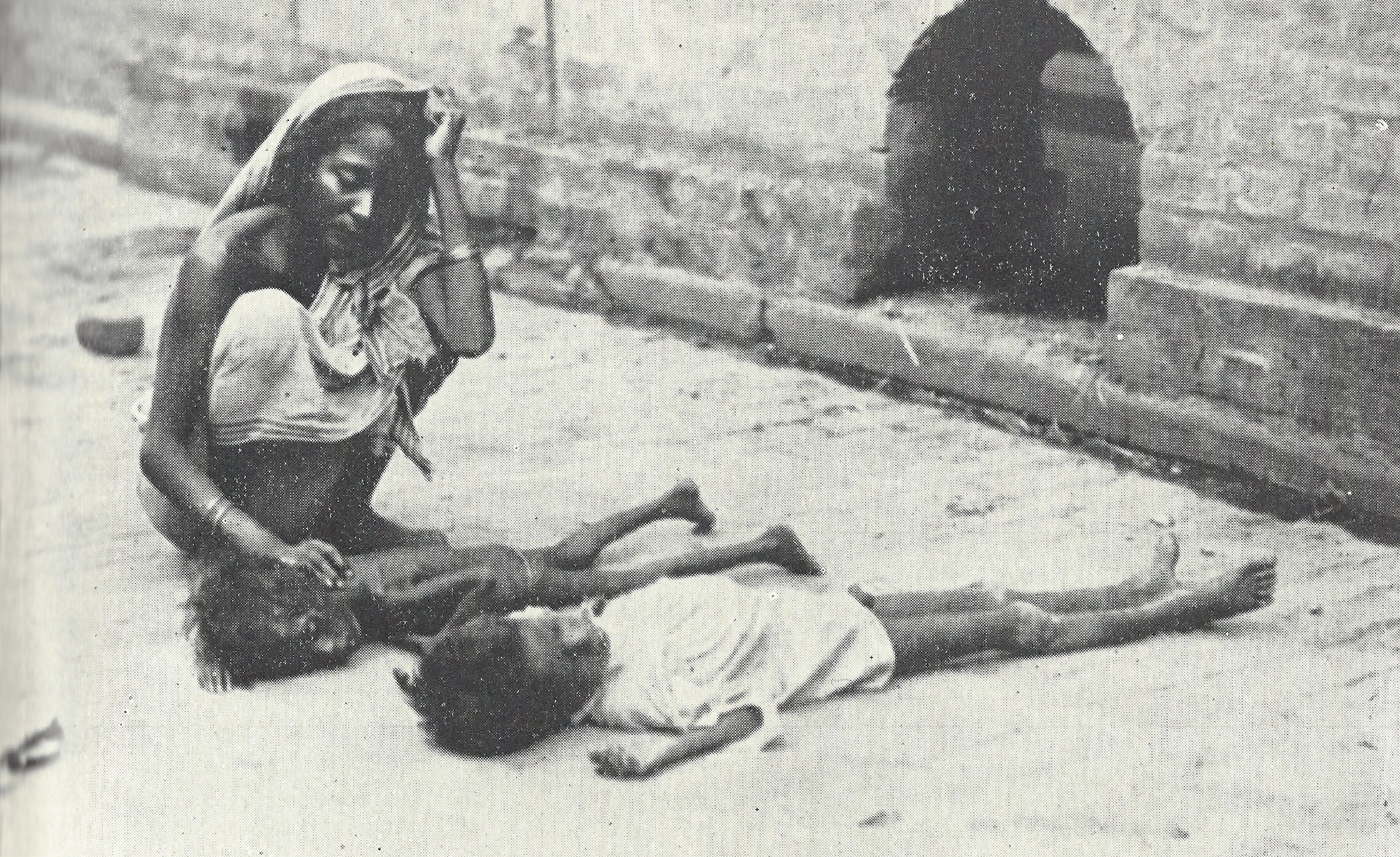
Dying children on a Calcutta street (the Statesman 22 August 1943)

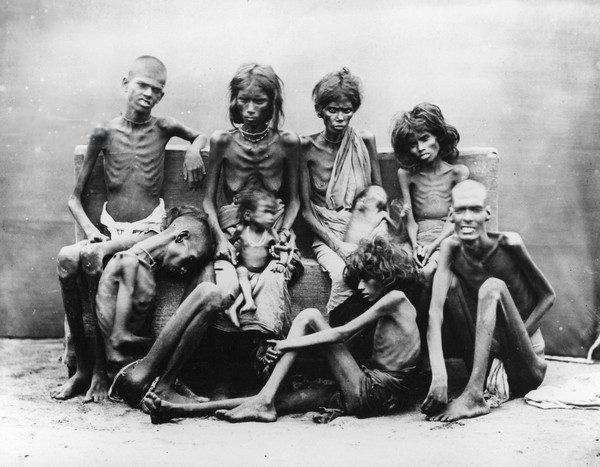
Victims of the Madras Famine, 1877

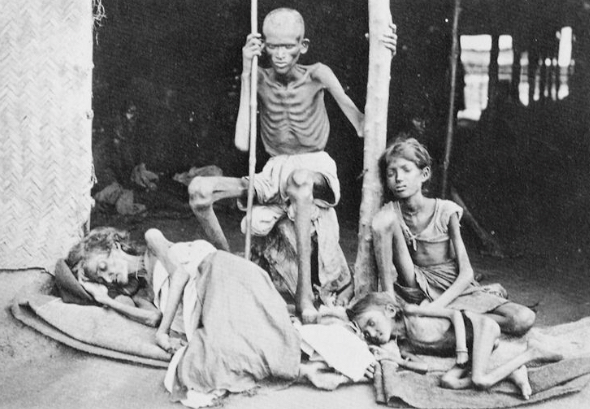
1876 1877 1878 1879 Famine Genocide in India Madras under British colonial rule

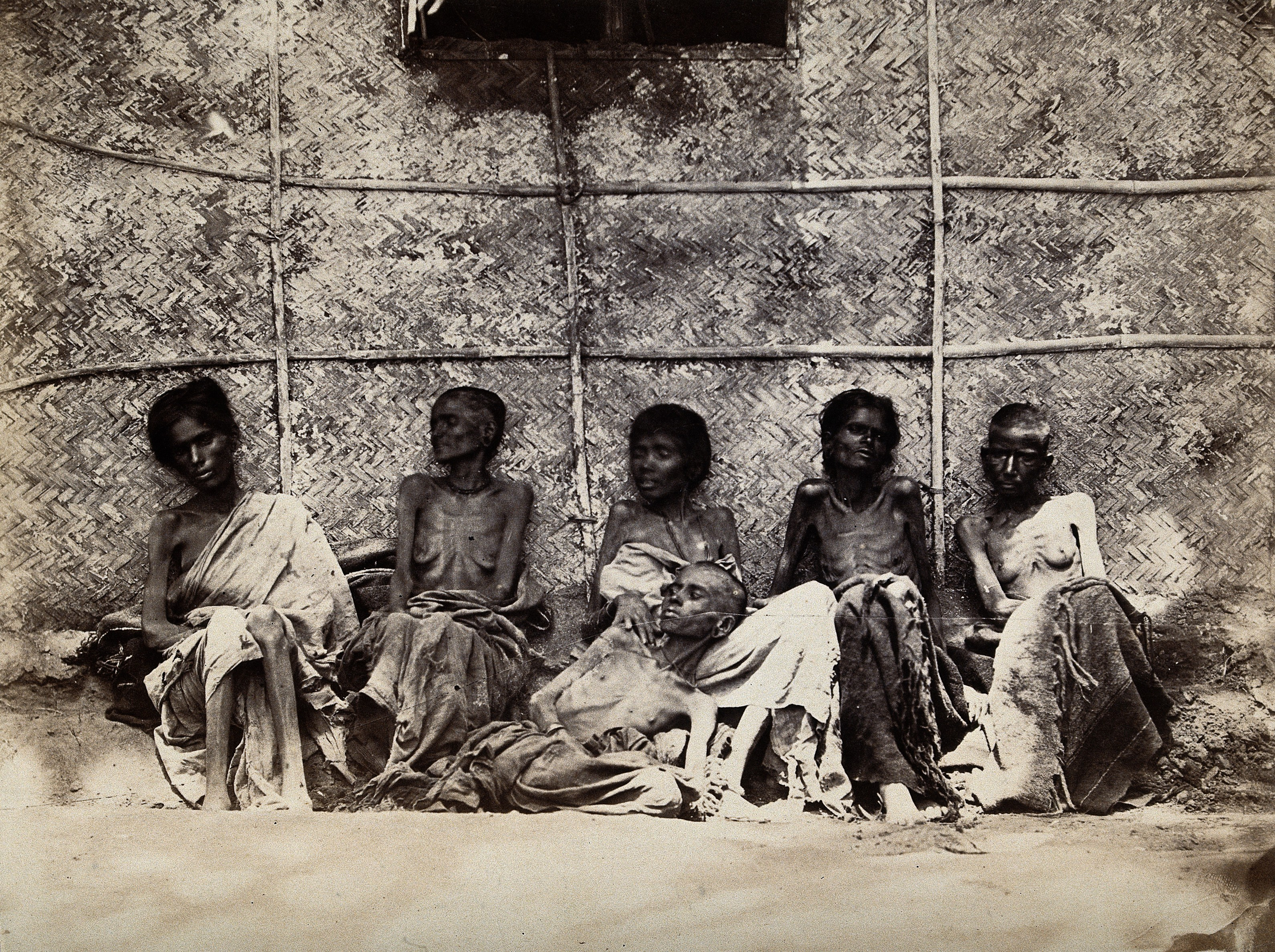
Famine in Mysore, India; six emaciated women, five sitting a Wellcome

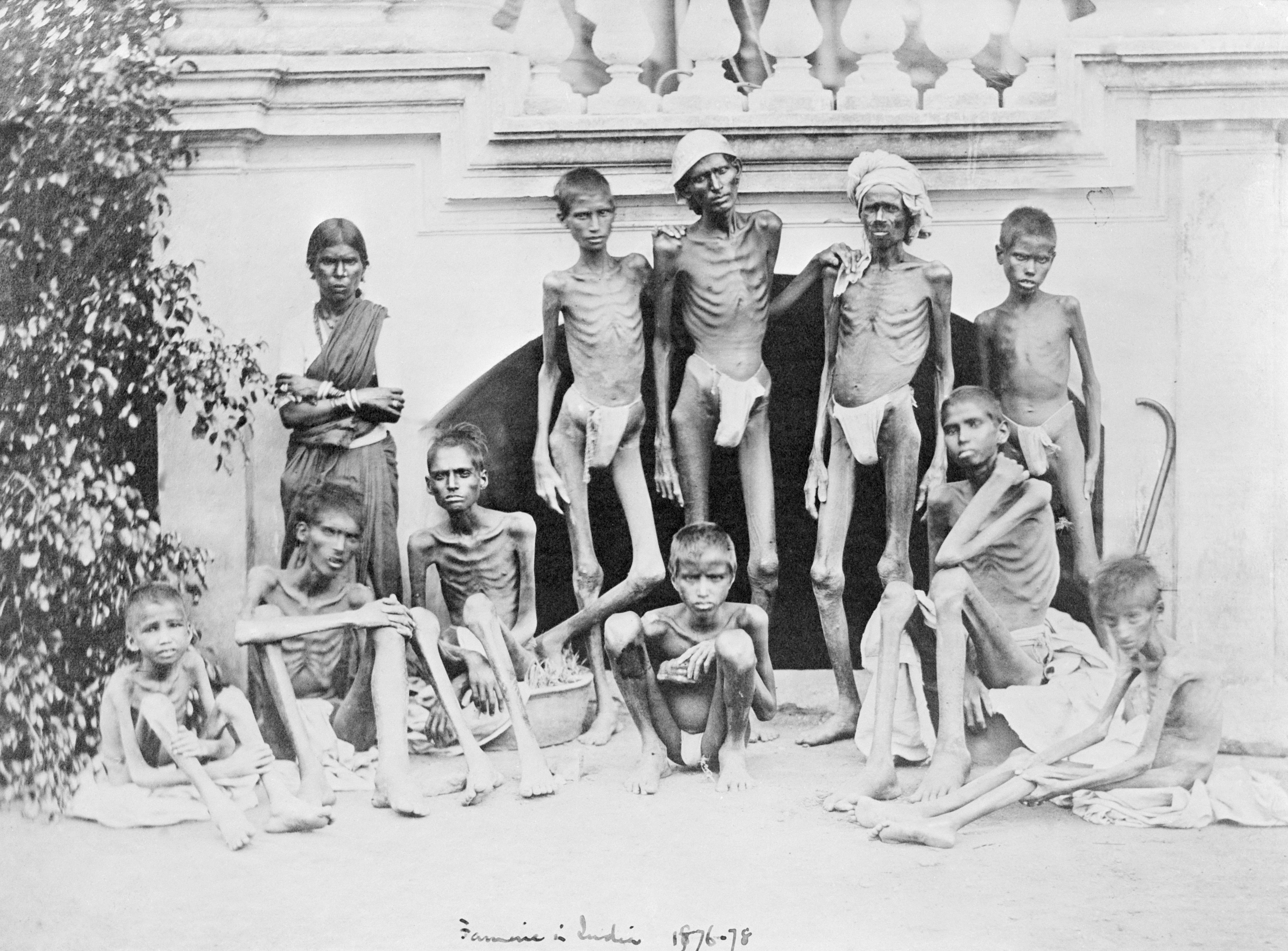
Famine in India; a group of emaciated young men wearing loin Wellcome

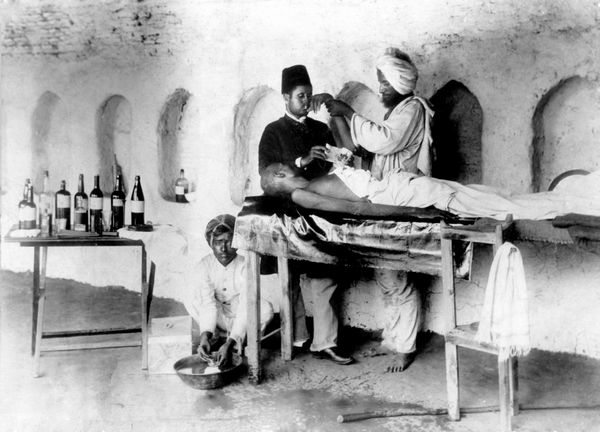
Relief work during the great famine in South India (1876–78)

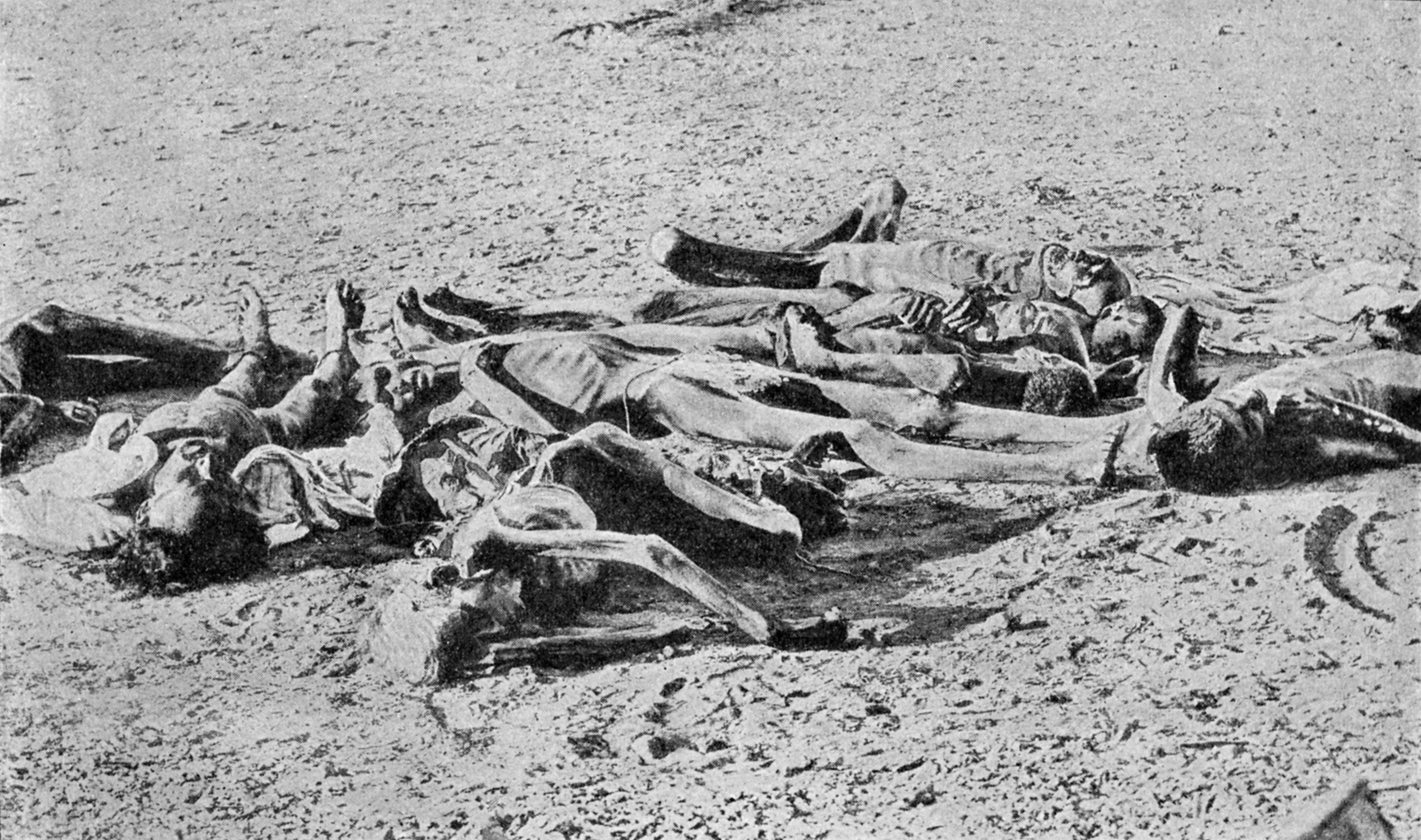
Corpses of Famine Victims enhaced

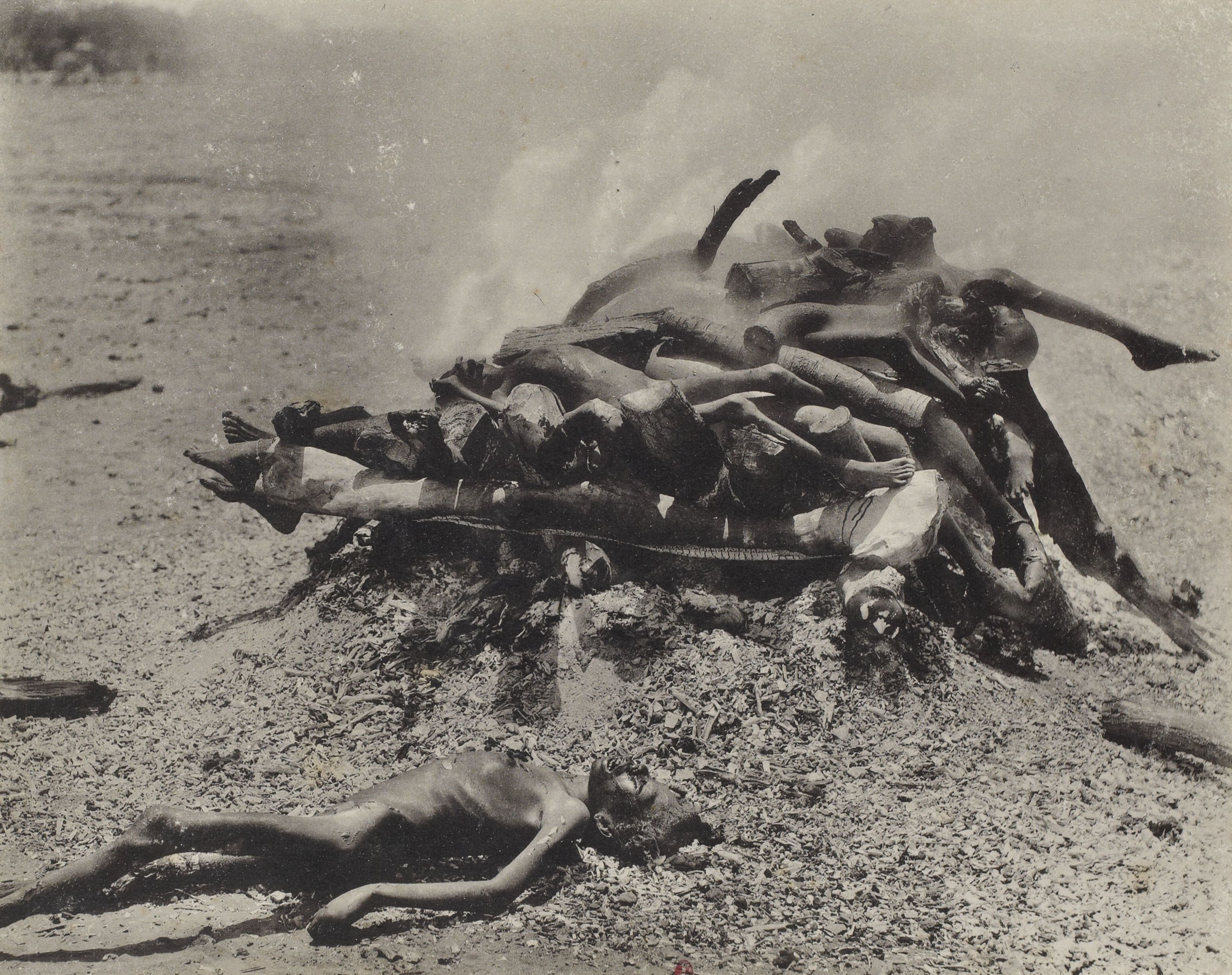
Cremation of people who died from famine in India

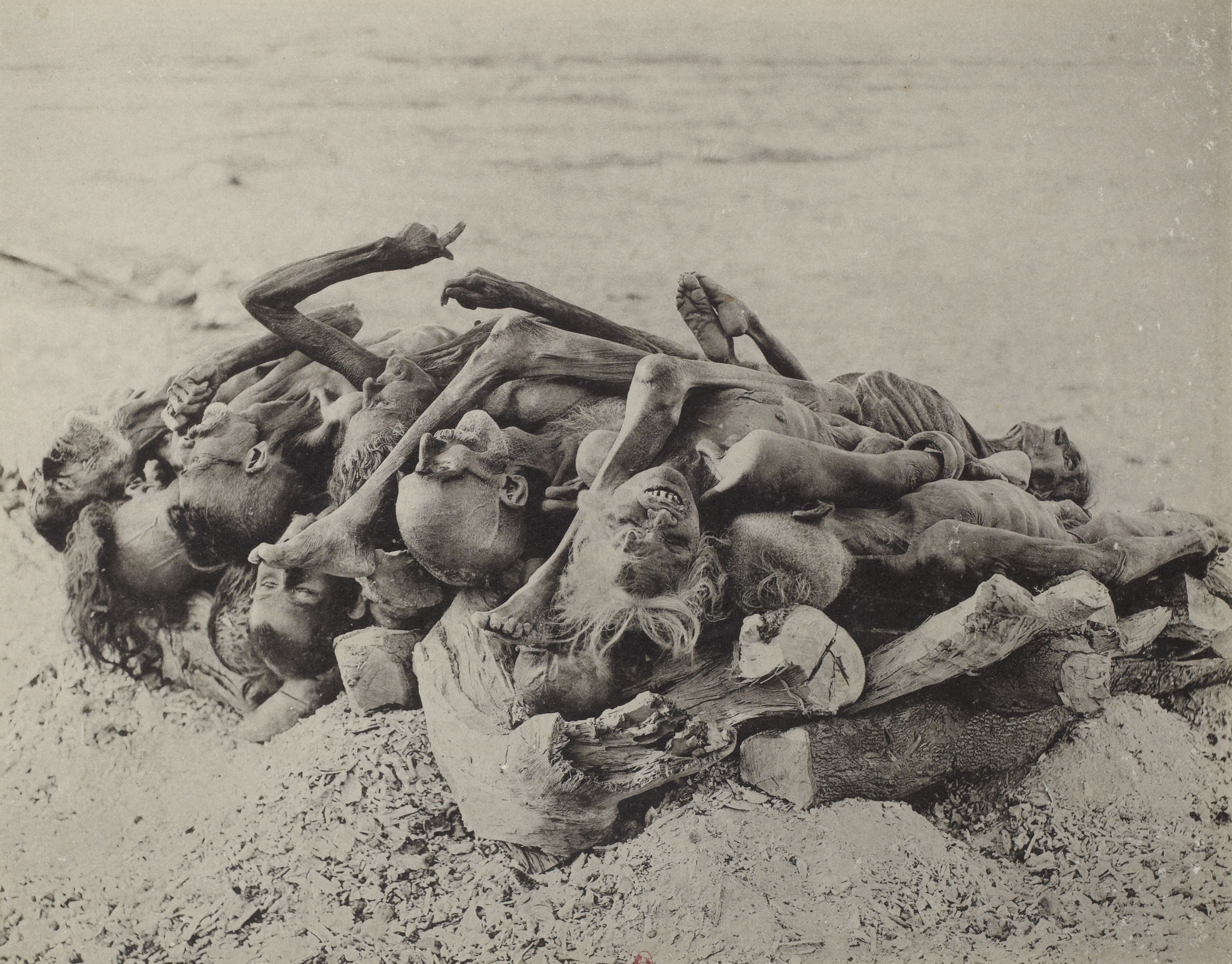
People died from famine in India

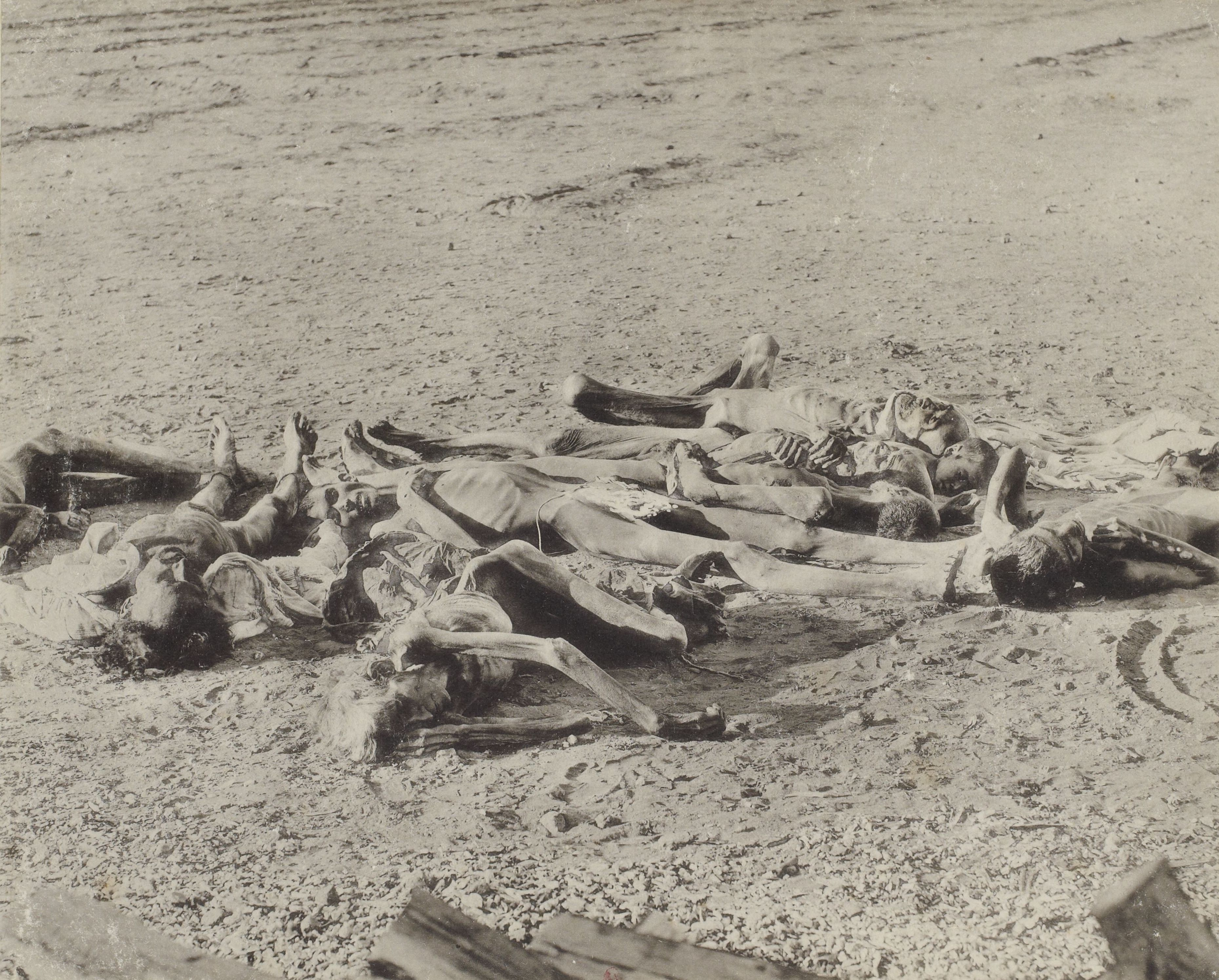
People died from famine in India

== See also ==
- Drought in India
- Great Famine (Ireland)
- List of famines
- Timeline of major famines in India prior to 1765
- Timeline of major famines in India during British rule
