= Bihar drought of 1966–1967 =

Natural disaster in India

The Bihar drought of 1966–1967 was a drought in Bihar and eastern Uttar Pradesh, India. The official death toll from starvation in the Bihar drought was about 70,000, roughly half of which occurred in the state of Bihar.

== Price increases for food grains ==
The wholesale price of food grains in Bihar had increased while there was a marginal increase in the prices in other states. The annual production of food grains had dropped in Bihar from 7.5 million tonnes in 1965–1966 to 7.2 million tonnes in 1966–1967 during the Bihar drought. There was an even sharper drop in 1966–1967 to 4.3 million tonnes. The national grain production dropped from 89.4 million tonnes in 1964–1965 to 72.3 in 1965–1966 – a 19% drop. The rise in prices of food grains caused migration and starvation, but the public distribution system, relief measures by the government, and voluntary organizations limited the impact.

== Food donations from the United States ==
On a number of occasions, the Indian government sought food and grain from the United States to provide replacement for damaged crops; however, US food aid was limited by Lyndon B. Johnson in retaliation for Indian criticism on the US's role in the Vietnam War.

== See also ==
- Deccan famine of 1630–1632
- Famine in India
- Bihar famine of 1873–1874

== Bibliography ==
- American Association for the Advancement of Science; Indian National Science Academy; International Rice Research Institute; Indian Council of Agricultural Research (1989), Climate and food security: papers presented at the International Symposium on Climate Variability and Food Security in Developing Countries, 5–9 February 1987 New Delhi, India, Climate and Food Security: Papers Presented at the International Symposium on Climate Variability and Food Security in Developing Countries, 5–9 February 1987 New Delhi, India, vol. 1987, Manila: The Institute, ISBN 978-971-10-4210-3
- Drèze, Jean; Sen, Amartya Kumar (1991), Hunger and Public Action, Studies in Development Economics, Oxford; New York: Clarendon Press, ISBN 978-0-19-828365-2, LCCN 89025504
