= Timeline of major famines in India prior to 1765 =

The timeline of major famines in India prior to 1765 covers major famines recorded in India between 1900 BC and 1765 AD. The famines included here span the entirety of the Indian subcontinent, currently comprising the Republic of India, Islamic Republic of Pakistan and the People's Republic of Bangladesh. The year 1765 is chosen as the end date as that was the start of the colonial period.

== Timeline ==
Chronological list of famines in India between 1900 BC and 1765 AD
Year	Area affected	Mortality (if known)
Between 1900 BC and 1300 BC	Harappan civilization	Unknown
Between 1100 BC and 500 BC	Vedic kingdoms	Unknown
500s BC	Northern India	Unknown
Between 500 BC and 322 BC	Northern India	Unknown
Between 322 BC and 297 BC	Magadha	Unknown
269 BC	Kalinga	100,000+
Between 200 BC and 1 AD	Indian subcontinent	9,000,000
Between 1 AD and 200 AD	Indian subcontinent	1,000,000
Between 200 and 400	Indian subcontinent	13,000,000
600s	Thanjavur, Tamil Nadu	Unknown
700s	Indian subcontinent	7,000,000
800s	Indian subcontinent	5,000,000
917–918	Kashmir	Unknown
1054	Thanjavur, Tamil Nadu	Unknown
1335–1342	Delhi	2,000+
1396-1407	South India	Unknown
1396-1407	Deccan	Unknown
1460	Deccan	Unknown
1509	Bangalore (to possible Coromandel Coast)	Unknown
1520	Deccan to South India	Unknown
1521	Malabar Coast, Afghanistan	Unknown
1525-26	Gujarat, Multan	Unknown
1528	Ahmednagar	Unknown
1534	Kashmir	Unknown
1539-40	Cambay	Unknown
1540-42	Sindh	Unknown
1544	Parava	Unknown
1550 (roughly)	Kollam, Punjab	Unknown
1555-56	Delhi	Unknown
1557	Cochin	Unknown
1564	Goa	Unknown
1570 (roughly)	Cambay, Fishery Coast, Tamil Nadu, Goa	Unknown
1572	Sirhind	Unknown
1574-75	Gujarat, Bengal, Bihar, Scarcity in UP	Unknown
1576	Kashmir	Unknown
1577	Kutch, Punjab	Unknown
1578	Bikaner	Unknown
1591	Goa	Unknown
1595-98	Punjab, Doab	Unknown
1613	Udaipur Hill Tracts	Unknown
1614-16	Doab, Mewar (only 1614, roughly)	Unknown
1616-17	Kashmir	Unknown
1618-19	Southern Mughal Empire, Coromandel	Unknown
1619	Goa	Unknown
1622	South East India (since 1620)	Unknown
1626	Fishery Coast	Unknown
1628	Masulipatam	Unknown
1629-32	Deccan	Unknown
1630	Entire India	7,400,000+
1631	Entire India (continuation from 1630)	7,400,000+
1632-3	Entire India (continued from 1630)	7,400,000+
1635	Northern India	Unknown
1636	South-East India, Punjab	Unknown
1640-41	Central India, South-East India	Unknown
1641 (or 1642)	Kashmir	Unknown
1642	East Coast of India	Unknown
1644	Madurai to Coromandel Coast	Unknown
1646-48 (till 1647 in Madurai to Coromandel Coast)	Madurai to Coromandel Coast, Punjab	Unknown
1647	Agra to Ahmedabad	Unknown
1648-49	Madurai to Coromandel Coast	Unknown
1649	Goa	Unknown
1650-51	North-Central India	Unknown
1651	Kashmir	Unknown
1658-61	Northwest to East India	Unknown
1659-61	South-East India	Unknown
1661	Central North India, Mewar	Unknown
1662-63	Eastern Bengal	Unknown
1663-64	Punjab to Gujarat, South-East India	Unknown
1665	Jaipur	Unknown
1669-70	Bombay	Unknown
1670-71	Bihar, Bengal	100,000+
1671-73	Deccan (Bombay Karanatak)	Unknown
1673-75	Madurai to Gingee, Gujarat	Unknown
1678	Marwar, Madurai	Unknown
1681	Negapatnam, Marwar	Unknown
1682	Ahmedabad	Unknown
1685-6 (only 1685 in Kashmir)	Kashmir, Southern India	Unknown
1685-1689	South-East India, Deccan (only 1687), Golconda (1685-1687)	Unknown
1688	Mandi state, Delhi (possibly)	Unknown
1690	Gujarat	Unknown
1694-1697 (till 1695 in Gujarat to Rajasthan, till 1697 in Coromandel Coast, 1696–7 in Marwar to North Gujarat)	Coromandel Coast, Gujarat to Rajasthan, Marwar to North Gujarat	Unknown
1699-1700	Satara	Unknown
1702-1704	Deccan	Unknown
1703	Thurr and Parker, Sindh	Unknown
1705-1707 (only 1705 in Marwar)	Deccan, Marwar	Unknown
1708-1709	Southern India	Unknown
1710-1712	Calcutta, East Coast	Unknown
1711-12 (only 1711 in Jaipur)	Jaipur, Coromandel Coast	Unknown
1713	Osmanabad (possibly to Nanded)	Unknown
1716	Jaipur	Unknown
1717-1720 (only till 1719 in Gujarat)	Madras to Madurai, Gujarat	Unknown
1721-1723	Canavay, Mysore	Unknown
1723-24 (possibly Gujarat in 1723)	Kashmir, Gujarat (possibly)	Unknown
1727-1728	Tamil Nadu	Unknown
1729	South-West India, Coromandel Coast	Unknown
1730	Ludhiana	Unknown
1731-1732 (only 1731 in Coromandel Coast and Kashmir)	Gujarat, Coromandel Coast to Orissa, Kashmir	Unknown
1733-1736	Madras (extended to South-East India by 1734)	Unknown
1737-1738	East Coast, Malwa to Ahmedabad	Unknown
1738	Coromandel Coast to Tanjore (since 1737), Bengal	Unknown
1739	Delhi	Unknown
1741	Eastern Tamil Nadu	Unknown
1742-43	Gujarat	Unknown
1745	Kashmir, Nara area in Sindh (till 1752)	Unknown
1746-1747	Gujarat, Rajasthan, Coromandel Coast, Mysore, Osmanabad	Unknown
1750 (or 1751)	Bellary	Unknown
1751	East Gujarat	Unknown
1752-1755	South-West Sindh	Unknown
1753-54	Rohtak (in Haryana)	Unknown
1754	Kashmir	Unknown
1755	Kashmir, South-East Tamil Nadu (till 1756)	Unknown
1756	Gujarat, Marwar, Adoni	Unknown
1757	Kutch	Unknown
1758	Punjab	Unknown
1759-1761	Punjab (since 1758), Kutch to Sindh (till 1760), east Tamil Nadu (till 1760)	Unknown
1761	Bengal, Mewat, parts of Rajasthan	Unknown
1762	Multan	Unknown
1763	Mewar, Rajasthan	Unknown
1765	Kashmir	Unknown
