= Deccan famine of 1630–1632 =

Famine in Mughal-ruled India

- Country: Deccan, Mughal Empire
- Location: Deccan Plateau, Khandesh and Gujarat
- Period: 1630–1632
- Total deaths: 7.4 million
- Causes: War, destruction of crops by Mughal troops, back-to-back poor harvests
- Preceded by: Damajipant famine (1460)
- Succeeded by: Deccan in 1655, 1682 and 1884

The Deccan famine of 1630–1632 was a famine associated with a back-to-back crop failure. The famine took place during the reign of Mughal Emperor Shah Jahan. The famine was the result of three consecutive staple crop failures, causing plague and leading to intense hunger, disease, and displacement in the region. It is stated that the famine was created by Shah Jahan himself. In 1631, the army under Shah Jahan marched to Malwa as Khan Jahan Lodihad rebelled and joined hands with the Adil Shahis and the Nizam Shahis. The Mughal army intended to teach the rebel commander a lesson. The destruction of crops in Central India by Shah Jahan's armies has been well recorded by court chronicles and foreign travellers. According to a neutral, contemporary estimate, as many as 7.4 million people died in the region until 1631 alone.

== Account of Peter Mundy during Gujarat famine ==
Peter Mundy writes his first-hand account of the Gujarat famine as follows:

"The Gujarat famine began with a drought in 1630, attacks on crops by mice and locusts in the following year, and then excessive rain. Famine and water-borne diseases created high mortality: 3 million died in 1631. People migrated towards less affected areas, many died on the way, and dead bodies blocked the roads. Both Persian and European sources tell the story of this famine, with a subverted cornucopoeia of grotesque consumption patterns: cattle-hide was eaten, dead men’s bones were ground with flour, cannibalism was frequent, and people fed on corpses. Carts belonging to banjaras (carriers) transporting grain from the more productive regions of Malwa were intercepted and supplies diverted to feed Shah Jahan’s royal army in Burhanpur, who were fighting territorial wars in the Deccan (southern) provinces. The pre-famine price of wheat was 1 mahmudi per man; in 1631 it had risen to 16. Imperial charitable practices of opening free kitchens and offering land revenue remission had limited effect. Gujarat was one of the main production centres for calico cloth and this trade was badly affected by the death and migration of weavers."

== See also ==
- Bihar famine of 1966–1967
- Famine in India
