= Gomastha =

Indian agent of the British East India Company

Gomastha (also spelled Gumastha or Gumasta, Persian: agent) described an Indian agent of the British East India Company employed in the Company's colonies to sign bonds, usually compellingly, by local weavers and artisans to deliver goods to the Company. The prices of the goods were fixed by the gomasthas. The goods were exported by the Company to Europe. Earlier supply merchants very often lived within the weaving village, and had a close relationship with the weavers, looking after their needs and helping them in times of crisis. The new gomasthas were outsiders with no long-term social link with the village. They acted arrogantly, marched into villages with sepoys and peons, and punished weavers for delays. The weavers thus lost the space to bargain and sell to different buyers; the price they received from the Company was miserably low and the loans they had accepted tied them to the Company. A gomastha may also be described as ‘a paid manager of the private trader’s concerns’, who claimed ‘hardly any share in the profit and loss of his employer’s business’.

== Background ==
In the 18th century, the East India Company had established itself in India. Indian cotton and silk fabrics were in great demand worldwide and hence were of special interest to them. It proceeded to develop a system of management and control that would eliminate competition, control costs, and ensure regular supplies of cotton and silk goods. Given the small number of Englishmen, and their unfamiliarity with the local language and society, the Company turned to local intermediaries, and gave them legal authority to enforce contracts. The Company tried to eliminate the existing traders and brokers connected with the cloth trade, and establish a more direct control over the weaver. For this purpose they appointed paid servants called the gomasthas were employed who would obtain goods and from local weavers and fix their prices. The prices fixed were 15 per cent lower than market price and in extreme cases, even 40 per cent lower than the market price. They would also supervise weavers, collect supplies, and examine the quality of cloth. They also prevented Company weavers from dealing with other buyers.

== Style of working ==
The Company’s agents who had the right to enforce contracts could well use the same coercive power to extort rents from the weavers. Such opportunism seems to have been common even late into the textile venture. In case, weavers refused signing contracts they were subjected to torture and even awarded imprisonment. In this way the gomastas were useful in obtaining goods at a low price for the Company which made huge profits from their exports.

The eighteenth century marked the gradual dissolution of the Mughal Empire in India and the establishment of British rule, initially under the auspices of the East India Company. The company, in search of quick profits, assumed control of Bengal’s lucrative textile industry, which produced one - third of all cotton textiles used in Europe at the time. It appointed its own network of much - hated middlemen, the most important of whom were called gomastas, under the agency system of 1753. In the words of a former company employee, " . . . [the gomastha ] makes [the weavers] sign a bond for the delivery of a certain quantity of goods, at a certain time and price, and pays them part of the money in advance. The assent of the poor weavers is in general not deemed necessary . . . . Rights to the production of individual weavers were freely traded among the gomastas as if their clients were slaves. Those who refused to participate in the system were flogged, and on occasion killed. The prices the weavers received were, by one estimate, 20 to 40 percent less than they could have gotten in the marketplace.

–passage from, Nobel Peace Prize awardee and economist Muhammad Yunus's From Vanderbilt to Chittagong

The Company's Board of Trade records from 1793, 1815, and 1818, state that "as a rule the Company’s gomastas and other inferior servants extracted perquisites from the weavers, and not infrequently they were whipped or beaten with rattans [canes]." There were various kinds of "perquisites." One such was an extra charge: this might be a commission (dasturi), tribute (salami), or simply "expenses" (kharcha). Another was a deduction of a portion of the capital advance. Yet another was using debased currency to pay the weaver. The gomastha and his appraisers, sometimes in collusion with Company officials, would falsely appraise cloth quality. They would charge the Company for High Quality, but pay the weaver for low quality. The gomastas' profound knowledge about a particular area and their negotiating ability with local smaller merchants would be indispensable to firms.

== Complaints against Gomastas ==
A petition by the weavers of Santipur factory in 1801 contained various complaints regarding the gomasthas and their subordinates: "... [They] have taken a perquisite of one rupee upon every eight or nine rupees of the advances made us, before they will pay the money;" ,"He deducts half an anna out of every rupee as brokerage;", "We do not know what species of money they receive from the Government but when there is a batta [discount] on Gold Mohurs, they pay us in that coin ...". In 1804, weavers of Golaghar submitted a petition against the Resident at the factory and his gomastas, alleging, among other things, that they classified their cloths into lower categories but gave them to the Company as higher quality.
