= British Raj =

1858–1947 Crown rule in India

India
- 1858–1947
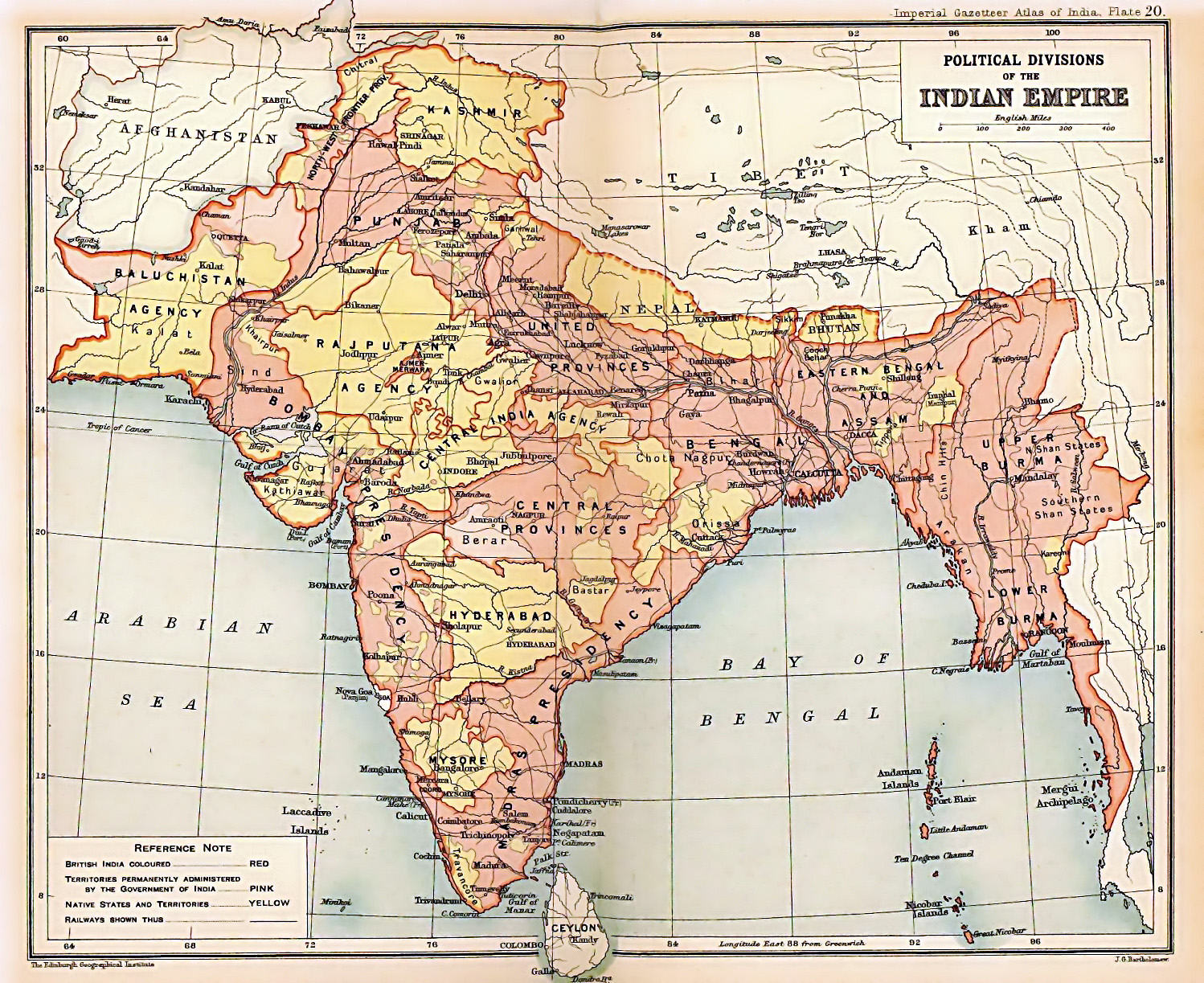
- Political subdivisions of the British Raj in 1909. British India is shown in two shades of pink; Sikkim, Nepal, Bhutan, and the princely states are shown in yellow.
- Status: Territory of the British Empire under an imperial political structure (Note: Comprising: British India: quasi-federation of presidencies and provinces directly governed by the Crown through the Viceroy and Governor-General of India; Princely states: nominally independent states governed by Indian rulers under the suzerainty of the Crown)
- Capital: Calcutta (Note: Simla was the summer capital of the Government of British India, not of the British Raj, i.e. the British Indian Empire, which included the princely states.) (1858–1911); New Delhi (1911/1931 (Note: The proclamation for New Delhi to be the capital was made in 1911, but the city was inaugurated as the capital of the Raj in February 1931.)–1947)
- Official languages: English (Note: English was the language of the courts and government.); Hindustani (Urdu) (Note: Urdu was also given official status in large parts of northern India, as were vernaculars elsewhere.); Other Indian languages (Note: Outside northern India, the local vernaculars were used as official languages in the lower courts and in government offices.)
- Demonyms: Indians, British Indians
- Government: Constitutional monarchy
- Monarch (Note: Queen (1858–1876), Queen-Empress (1876–1901), and King-Emperor (1901–1947))
  - 1858–1901: Victoria
  - 1901–1910: Edward VII
  - 1910–1936: George V
  - 1936: Edward VIII
  - 1936–1947: George VI
- Viceroy
  - 1858–1862 (first): Charles Canning
  - 1947 (last): Louis Mountbatten
- Secretary of State
  - 1858–1859 (first): Edward Stanley
  - 1947 (last): William Hare
- Legislature: Imperial Legislative Council
  - Upper house: Council of State
  - Lower house: Central Legislative Assembly
- History
  - Indian Rebellion of 1857: 10 May 1857
  - Government of India Act 1858: 2 August 1858
  - Indian Independence Act: 18 July 1947
  - Partition of India: 14–15 August 1947 at midnight

Area
  - Total: 4,993,650 km^{2} (1,928,060 sq mi)

Population
  - 1941: 389,000,000
- Currency: Indian rupee
Preceded by
Company rule in India
Succeeded by
1947: Dominion of India
Dominion of Pakistan
Persian Gulf Residency
1937: Colony of Burma
Colony of Aden
1898: Somaliland Protectorate
1867: Straits Settlements

The British Raj (/ˈrɑːdʒ/ RAHJ; from Hindustani rāj, 'reign', 'rule' or 'government') was the period of rule of the British Crown on the Indian subcontinent, lasting from 1858 to 1947. It is also called Crown rule in India, or direct rule in India. The region under British control was commonly called India in contemporaneous usage and included areas directly administered by the United Kingdom, which were collectively called British India, and areas ruled by indigenous rulers, but under British paramountcy, called the princely states. The region was sometimes called the Indian Empire, though not officially. As India, it was a founding member of the League of Nations and a founding member of the United Nations in San Francisco in 1945. India was a participating state in the Summer Olympics in 1900, 1920, 1928, 1932, and 1936.

This system of governance was instituted on 28 June 1858, when, after the Indian Rebellion of 1857, the rule of the East India Company was transferred to the Crown in the person of Queen Victoria (who, in 1876, was proclaimed Empress of India). It lasted until 1947 when the British Raj was partitioned into two sovereign dominion states: the Union of India (later the Republic of India) and Dominion of Pakistan (later the Islamic Republic of Pakistan and People's Republic of Bangladesh after the 1971 Proclamation of Bangladeshi Independence). At the inception of the Raj in 1858, Lower Burma was already a part of British India; Upper Burma was added in 1886, and the resulting union, Burma, was administered as an autonomous province until 1937, when it became a separate British colony, gaining its independence in 1948. It was renamed Myanmar in 1989. The Chief Commissioner's Province of Aden was also part of British India at the inception of the British Raj and became a separate colony known as Aden Colony in 1937 as well. Another dependency, the Persian Gulf Residency, was separated from India upon independence.

== Geographical extent ==
The British Raj extended over almost all present-day India, Pakistan, Bangladesh and Myanmar, except for small holdings by other European nations such as Goa (Portugal) and Pondicherry (France). This area is very diverse, containing the Himalayan mountains, fertile floodplains, the Indo-Gangetic Plain, a long coastline, tropical dry forests, arid uplands, and the Thar Desert. In addition, at various times, it included Aden (from 1858 to 1937), Lower Burma (from 1858 to 1937), Upper Burma (from 1886 to 1937), British Somaliland (briefly from 1884 to 1898), and the Straits Settlements (briefly from 1858 to 1867). Burma was separated from India and directly administered by the British Crown from 1937 until its independence in 1948. To the west, from the early 20th century, the Persian Gulf Residency which included the Trucial States, Kuwait, Bahrain, Qatar and Muscat and Oman had a status analogous to that of the princely states.

Among other countries in the region, Ceylon (now Sri Lanka), which referred to the coastal regions and northern part of the island at that time, was ceded to Britain in 1802 under the Treaty of Amiens. These coastal regions were temporarily administered under Madras Presidency between 1793 and 1798, but, for later periods, the British governors reported to London, and it was not part of the Raj. The kingdoms of Nepal and Bhutan, having fought wars with the British, subsequently signed treaties with them and were recognised by the British as independent states. The Kingdom of Sikkim was established as a princely state after the Anglo-Sikkimese Treaty of 1861; however, the issue of sovereignty was left undefined. The Emirate of Afghanistan was also a limited British protectorate from the signing of the Treaty of Gandamak in 1879 until the Anglo-Afghan Treaty of 1919.

The Maldive Islands were a British protectorate from 1887 to 1965 but not part of British India.

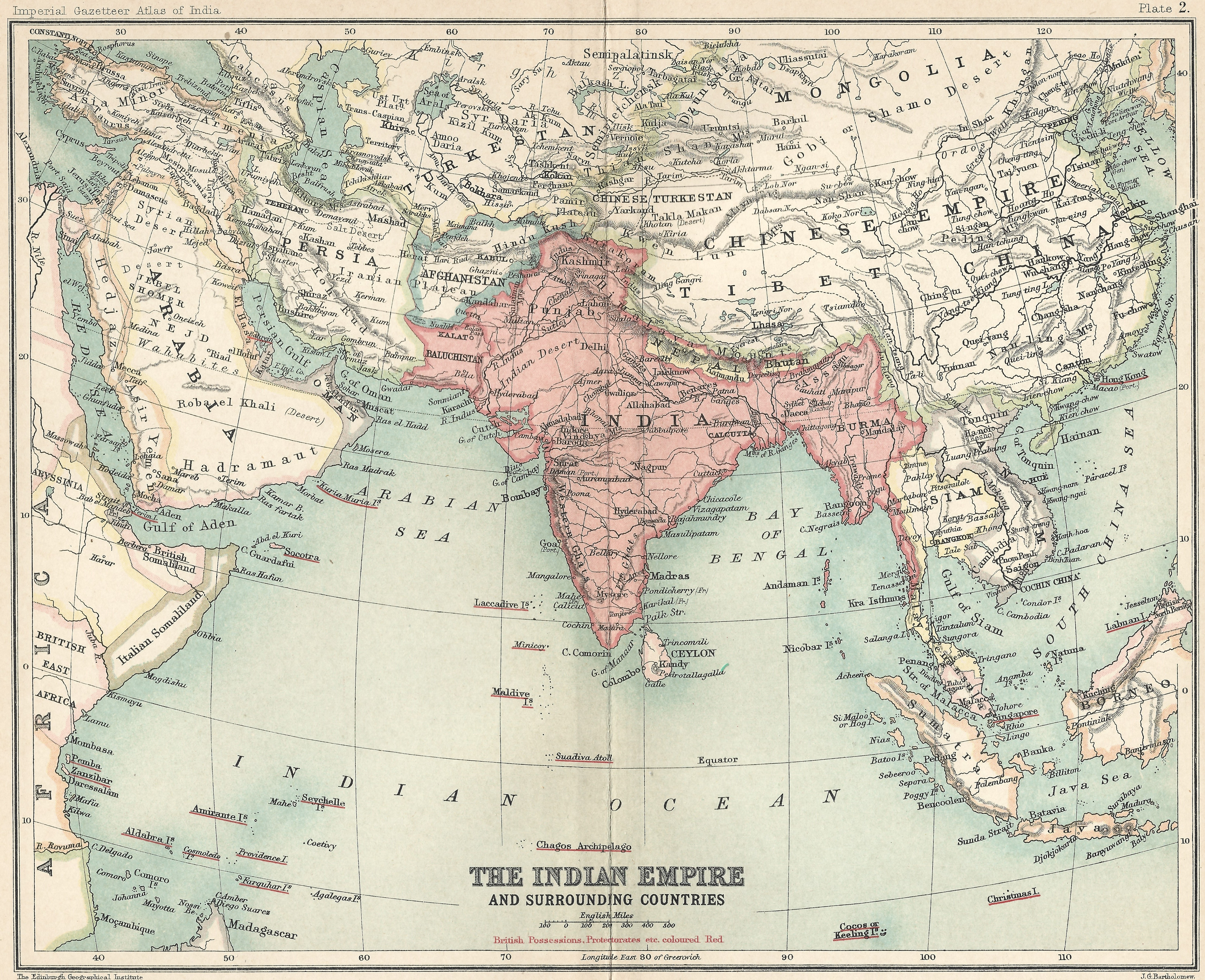
The British Raj and surrounding countries are shown in 1909

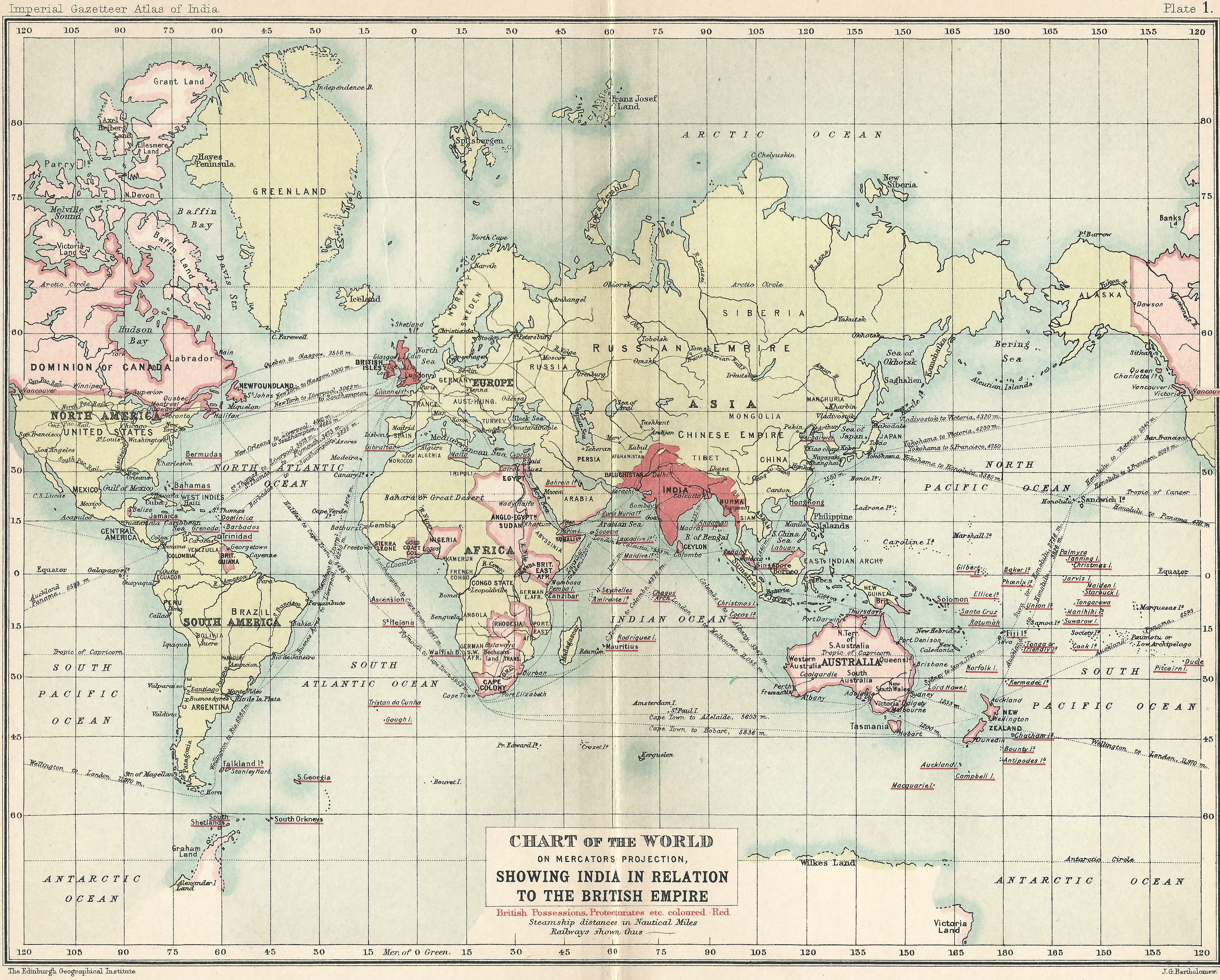
The British Raj in relation to the British Empire in 1909

== History ==
=== 1858–1868: Rebellion aftermath, critiques, and responses ===
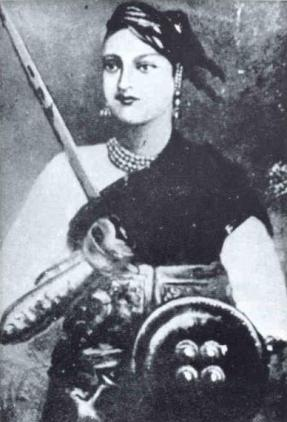
Lakshmibai, Rani of Jhansi, one of the principal leaders of the Great Uprising of 1857, who had lost her kingdom by the Doctrine of lapse

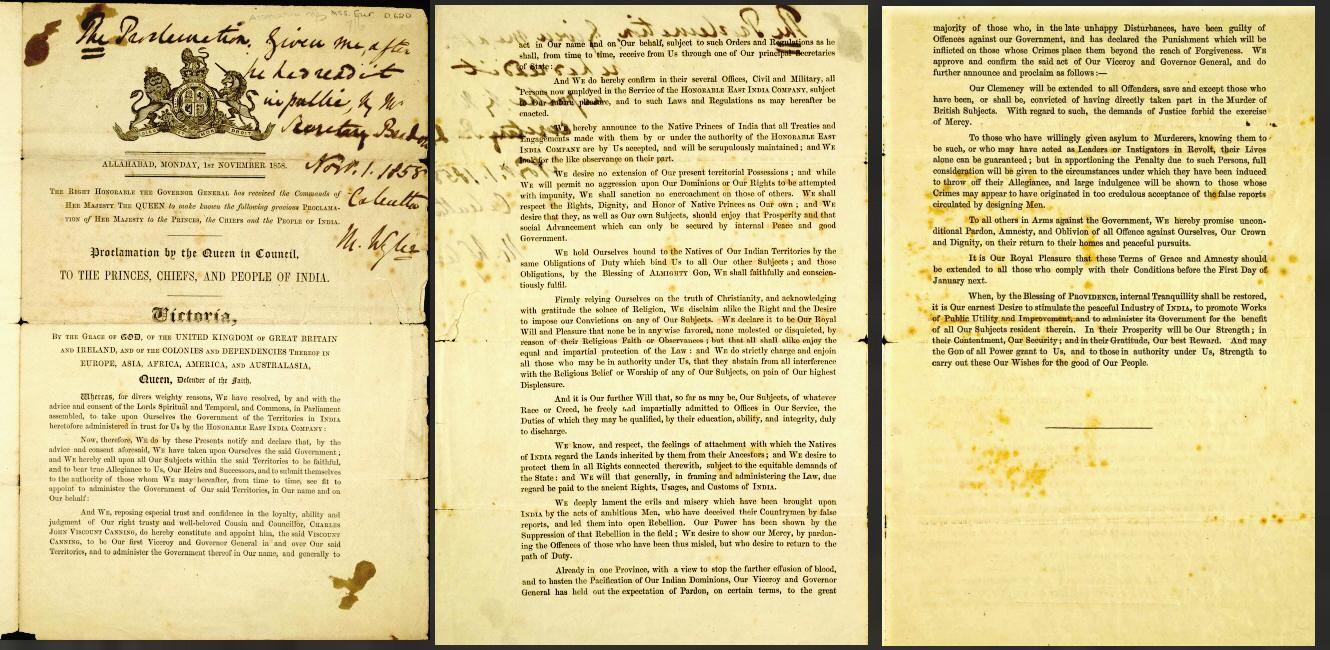
The proclamation to the "Princes, Chiefs, and People of India", issued by Queen Victoria on 1 November 1858

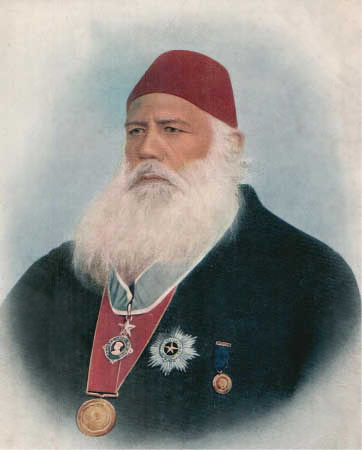
Sir Syed Ahmed Khan founder of the Muhammadan Anglo-Oriental College, wrote one of the early critiques, The Causes of the Indian Mutiny

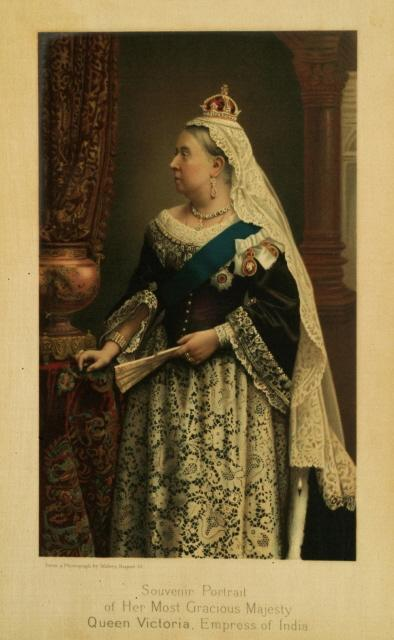
An 1887 souvenir portrait of Queen Victoria as Empress of India, 30 years after the Great Uprising

Although the Indian Rebellion of 1857 had shaken the British enterprise in India, it had not derailed it. Until 1857, the British, especially under Lord Dalhousie, had been hurriedly building an India which they envisaged to be on par with Britain itself in the quality and strength of its economic and social institutions. After the rebellion, they became more circumspect. Much thought was devoted to the causes of the rebellion, and three main lessons were drawn. First, at a practical level, it was felt that there needed to be more communication and camaraderie between the British and Indians—not just between British army officers and their Indian staff but in civilian life as well. The Indian army was completely reorganised: units composed of the Muslims and Brahmins of the United Provinces of Agra and Oudh, who had formed the core of the rebellion, were disbanded. New regiments, like the Sikhs and Baluchis, composed of Indians who, in British estimation, had demonstrated steadfastness, were formed. From then on, the Indian army was to remain unchanged in its organisation until 1947. The 1861 Census had revealed that the English population in India was 125,945. Of these, only about 41,862 were civilians as compared with about 84,083 European officers and men of the Army. In 1880, the standing Indian Army consisted of 66,000 British soldiers, 130,000 Natives, and 350,000 soldiers in the princely armies.

Second, it was also felt that both the princes and the large land-holders, by not joining the rebellion, had proved to be, in Lord Canning's words, "breakwaters in a storm". They too were rewarded in the new British Raj by being integrated into the British-Indian political system and having their territories guaranteed. At the same time, it was felt that the peasants, for whose benefit the large land reforms of the United Provinces had been undertaken, had shown disloyalty by, in many cases, fighting for their former landlords against the British. Consequently, no more land reforms were implemented for the next 90 years: Bengal and Bihar were to remain the realms of large land holdings (unlike the Punjab and Uttar Pradesh).

Third, the British felt disenchanted with Indian reaction to social change. Until the rebellion, they had enthusiastically pushed through social reform, like the ban on sati by Lord William Bentinck. It was now felt that traditions and customs in India were too strong and too rigid to be changed easily; consequently, no more British social interventions were made, especially in matters dealing with religion, even when the British felt very strongly about the issue (as in the instance of the remarriage of Hindu child widows). This sentiment was exemplified further in Queen Victoria's Proclamation released immediately after the rebellion. The proclamation stated that "We disclaim alike our Right and Desire to impose Our Convictions on any of Our Subjects", demonstrating official British commitment to abstaining from social intervention in India.

=== 1858–1880: Railways, canals, Famine Code ===
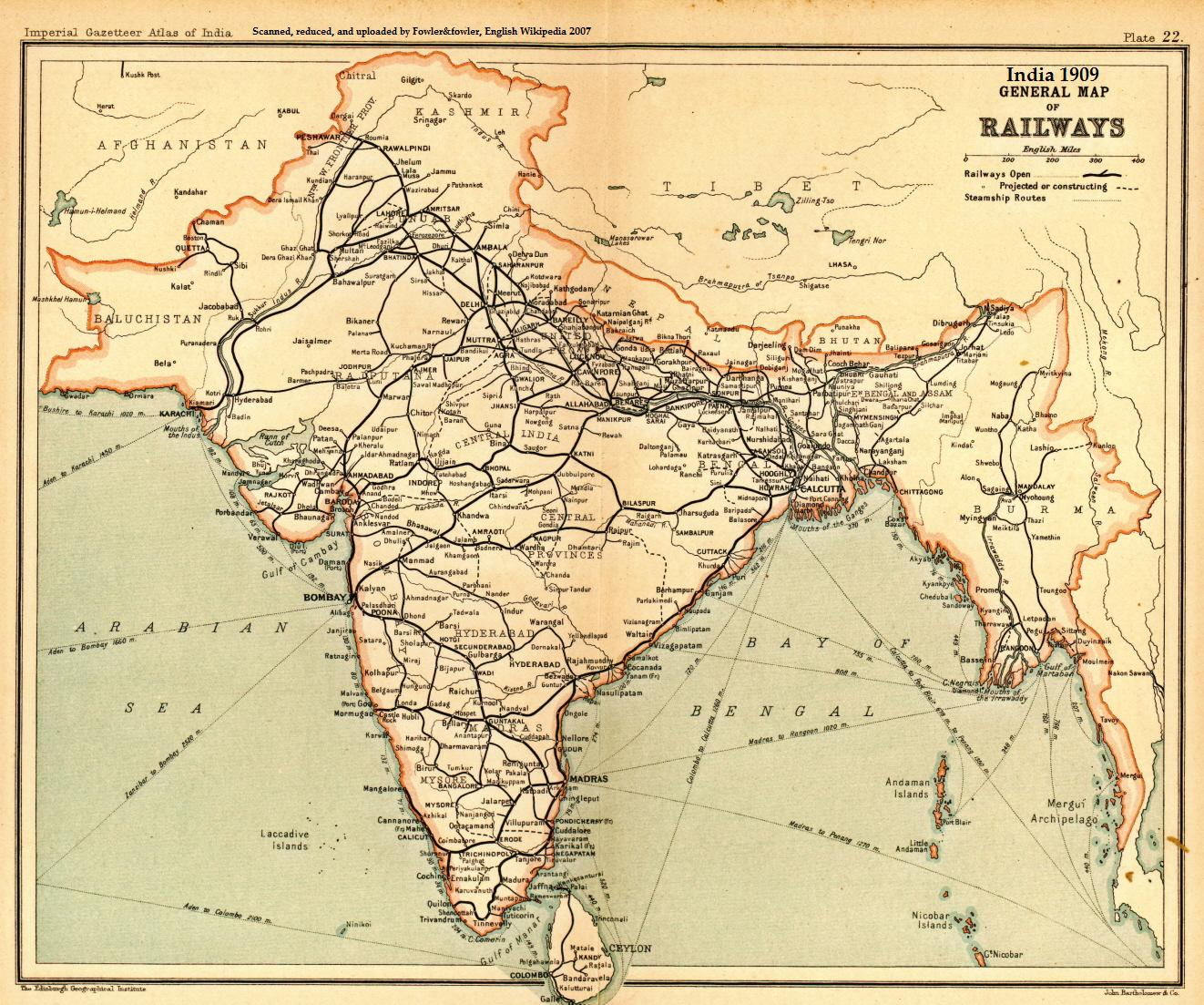
The 1909 map of Indian Railways, the fourth largest in the world. Railway construction began in 1853.

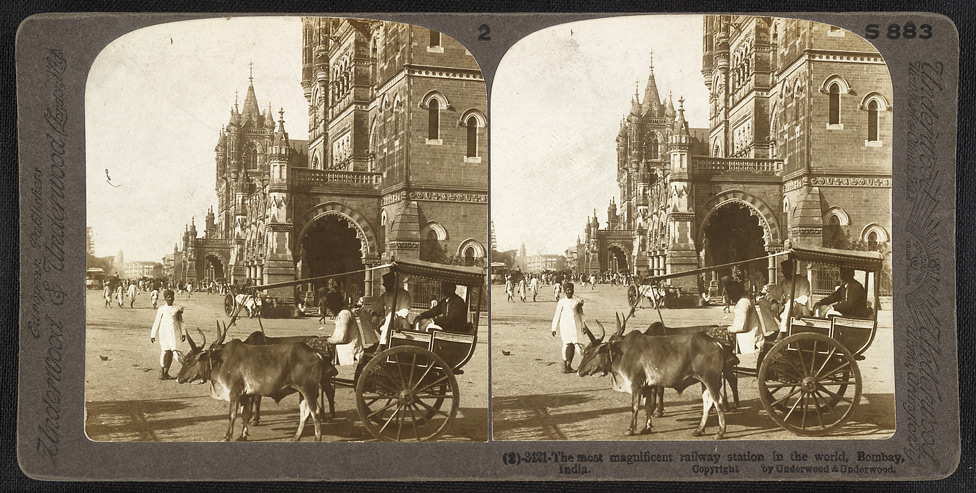
Stereographic image of Victoria Terminus, Bombay, completed in 1888

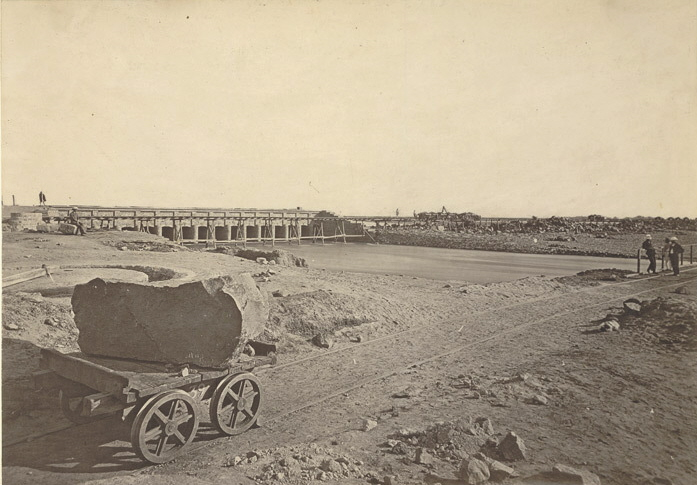
The Agra canal (c. 1873), a year from completion, was closed to navigation in 1904 to increase irrigation during a famine.

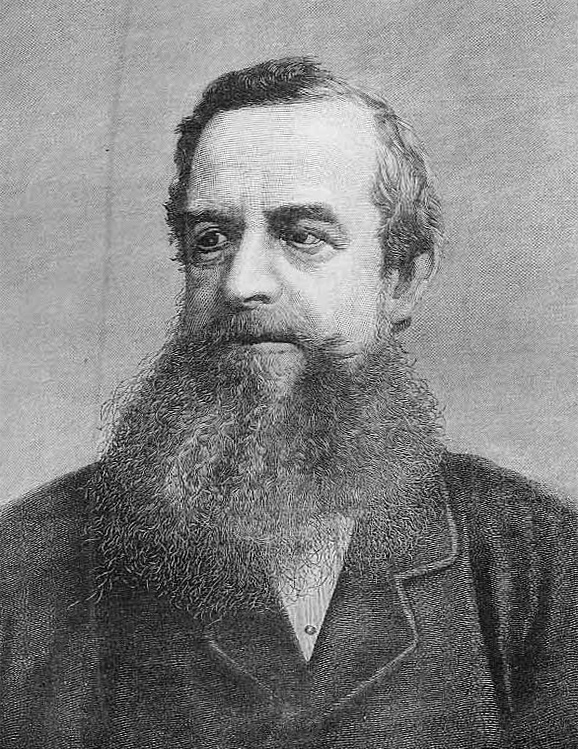
Lord Ripon, the Liberal Viceroy of India, who instituted the Famine Code. 1880.

In the second half of the 19th century, both the direct administration of India by the British crown and the technological change ushered in by the industrial revolution had the effect of closely intertwining the economies of India and Great Britain. In fact, many of the major changes in transport and communications (that are typically associated with the Crown Rule of India) had already begun before the Mutiny. Since Dalhousie had embraced the technological change then rampant in Great Britain, India too saw the rapid development of all those technologies. Railways, roads, canals, and bridges were rapidly built in India, and telegraph links were equally rapidly established so that raw materials, such as cotton, from India's hinterland, could be transported more efficiently to ports, such as Bombay, for subsequent export to England. Likewise, finished goods from England were transported back for sale in the burgeoning Indian markets. Unlike Britain, where the market risks for the infrastructure development were borne by private investors, in India, it was the taxpayers—primarily farmers and farm-labourers—who endured the risks, which, in the end, amounted to £50 million. Despite these costs, very little skilled employment was created for Indians. By 1920, with the fourth largest railway network in the world and a history of 60 years of its construction, only ten per cent of the "superior posts" in the Indian Railways were held by Indians.

The rush of technology was also changing the agricultural economy in India: by the last decade of the 19th century, a large fraction of some raw materials—not only cotton but also some food-grains—were being exported to faraway markets. Many small farmers, dependent on the whims of those markets, lost land, animals, and equipment to money-lenders. The latter half of the 19th century also saw an increase in the number of large-scale famines in India. Although famines were not new to the subcontinent, these were particularly severe, cumulatively causing deaths in the tens of millions. Many critics, both British and Indian, laid the blame at the doorsteps of the lumbering colonial administrations. There were also salutary effects: commercial cropping, especially in the newly canalled Punjab, led to increased food production for internal consumption. The railway network provided critical famine relief, notably reduced the cost of moving goods, and helped nascent Indian-owned industry. After the Great Famine of 1876–1878, the Indian Famine Commission report was issued in 1880, and the Indian Famine Codes, the earliest famine scales and programmes for famine prevention, were instituted. In one form or other, they would be implemented worldwide by the United Nations and the Food and Agricultural Organisation well into the 1970s.

=== 1880s–1890s: middle class, Indian National Congress ===
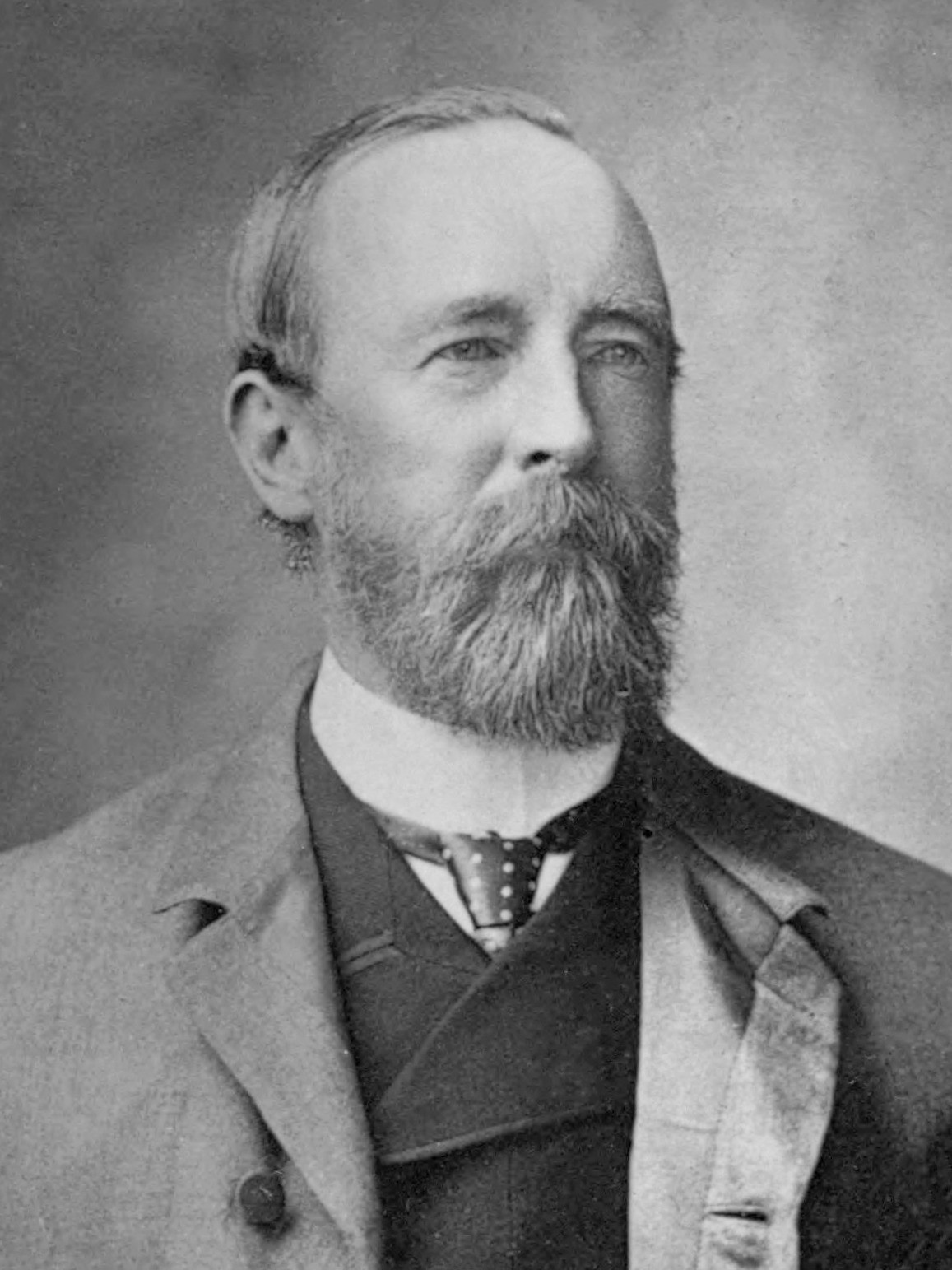
Allan Octavian Hume (1829–1912), who proposed the idea of the Indian National Congress in a letter to graduates of Calcutta University

Congress, Bombay, 28 December 1885. Third row (middle) (l. to r.) Dadabhai Naoroji, Hume, W. C. Bonerjee, and Pherozeshah Mehta.

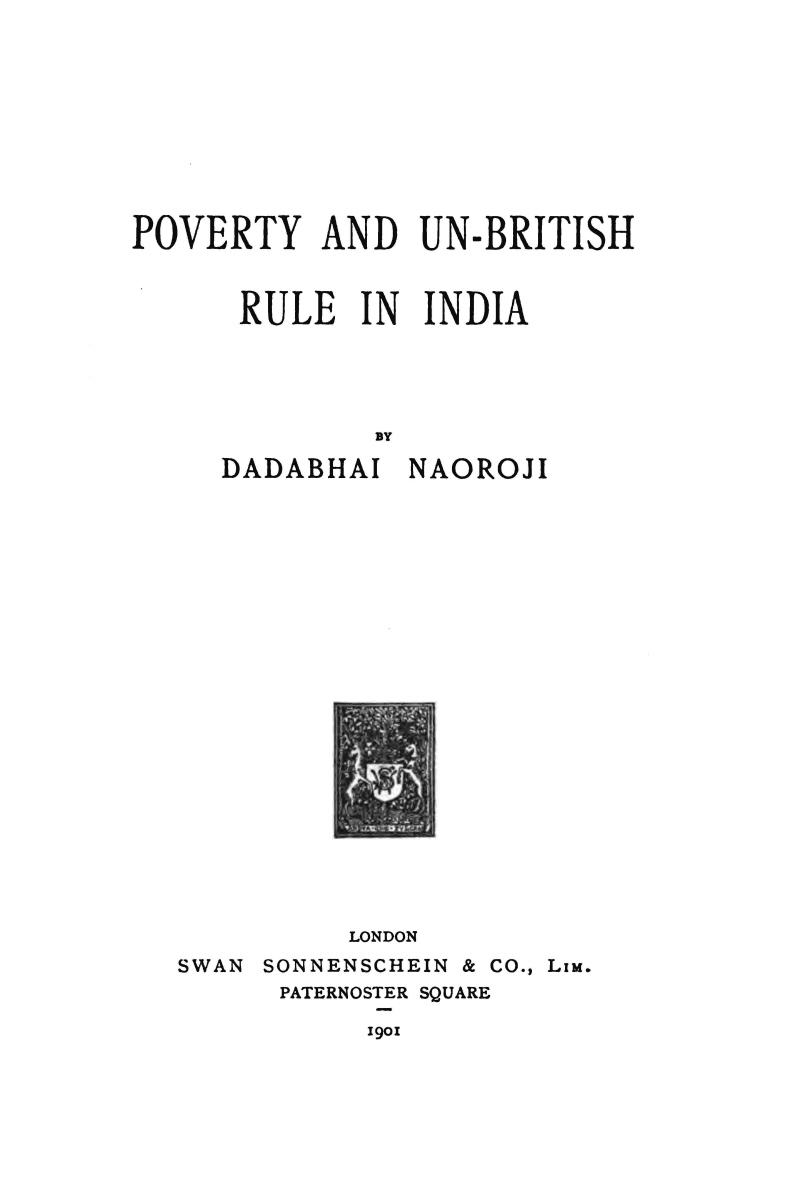
Poverty and the Un-British Rule in India, 1901, by Naoroji, Member, British Parliament (1892–1895), and Congress president (1886, 1893, 1906)

Mehta, lawyer, businessman, and president of the sixth session of the Indian National Congress in 1890

By 1880, a new middle class had arisen in India and spread thinly across the country. Moreover, there was a growing solidarity among its members, created by the "joint stimuli of encouragement and irritation". The encouragement felt by this class came from its success in education and its ability to avail itself of the benefits of that education, such as employment in the Indian Civil Service. It came too from Queen Victoria's proclamation of 1858 in which she had declared, "We hold ourselves bound to the natives of our Indian territories by the same obligation of duty which binds us to all our other subjects." Indians were especially encouraged when Canada was granted dominion status in 1867 and established an autonomous democratic constitution. Lastly, the encouragement came from the work of contemporaneous Oriental scholars like Monier Monier-Williams and Max Müller, who in their works had been presenting ancient India as a great civilization. Irritation, on the other hand, came not just from incidents of racial discrimination at the hands of the British in India but also from governmental actions like the use of Indian troops in imperial campaigns (e.g., in the Second Anglo-Afghan War) and the attempts to control the vernacular press (e.g., in the Vernacular Press Act of 1878).

It was, however, Viceroy Lord Ripon's partial reversal of the Ilbert Bill (1883), a legislative measure that had proposed putting Indian judges in the Bengal Presidency on equal footing with British ones, that transformed the discontent into political action. On 28 December 1885, professionals and intellectuals from this middle-class—many educated at the new British-founded universities in Bombay, Calcutta, and Madras, and familiar with the ideas of British political philosophers, especially the utilitarians assembled in Bombay—founded the Indian National Congress. The 70 men elected Womesh Chunder Bonerjee as the first president. The membership consisted of a Westernized elite, and no effort was made at this time to broaden the base.During its first 20 years, the Congress primarily debated British policy toward India. Its debates created a new Indian outlook that held Great Britain responsible for draining India of its wealth. Britain did this, the nationalists claimed, by unfair trade, by the restraint on indigenous Indian industry, and by the use of Indian taxes to pay the high salaries of the British civil servants in India.

Thomas Baring served as Viceroy of India 1872–1876. Baring's major accomplishments came as an energetic reformer who was dedicated to upgrading the quality of government in the British Raj. He began large-scale famine relief, reduced taxes, and overcame bureaucratic obstacles in an effort to reduce both starvation and widespread social unrest. Although appointed by a Liberal government, his policies were much the same as those of viceroys appointed by Conservative governments. Social reform was in the air by the 1880s. For example, Pandita Ramabai, poet, Sanskrit scholar, and a champion of the emancipation of Indian women, took up the cause of widow remarriage, especially of Brahmin widows, later converted to Christianity. By 1900, reform movements had taken root within the Indian National Congress. Congress member Gopal Krishna Gokhale founded the Servants of India Society, which lobbied for legislative reform (e.g., for a law to permit the remarriage of Hindu child widows) and whose members took vows of poverty, and worked among the untouchable community.

By 1905, a deep gulf opened between the moderates, led by Gokhale, who downplayed public agitation, and the new "extremists" who not only advocated agitation but also regarded the pursuit of social reform as a distraction from nationalism. Prominent among the extremists was Bal Gangadhar Tilak, who attempted to mobilise Indians by appealing to an explicitly Hindu political identity, displayed, for example, in the annual public Ganapati festivals that he inaugurated in western India.

=== 1870s–1906: Muslim social movements, Muslim League ===
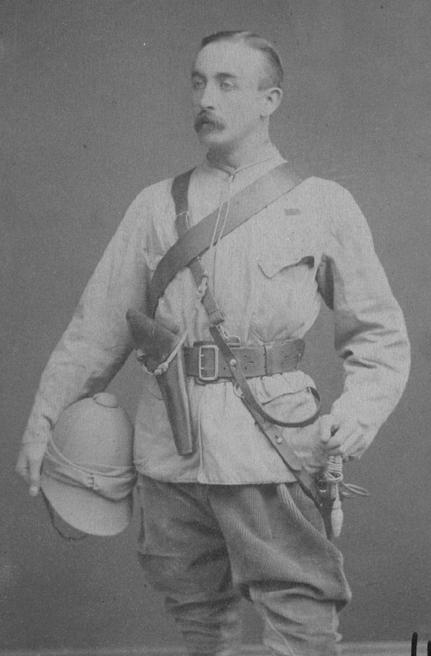
Lord Minto, the viceroy who replaced Curzon in 1906. The Minto-Morley Reforms of 1909 allowed separate Muslim electorates.

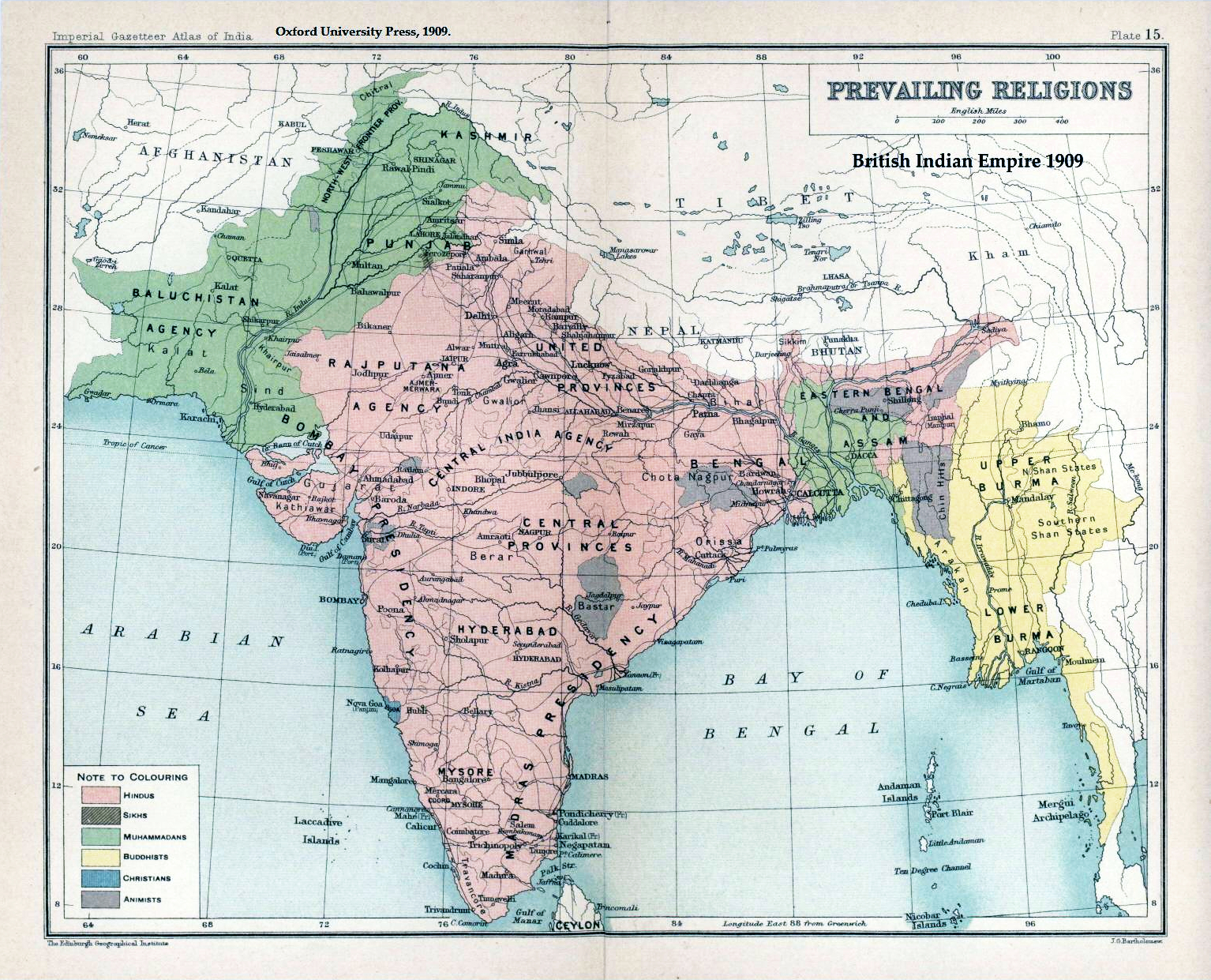
1909 Prevailing Religions, map of the British Indian Empire, 1909, showing the majority religions based on the Census of 1901

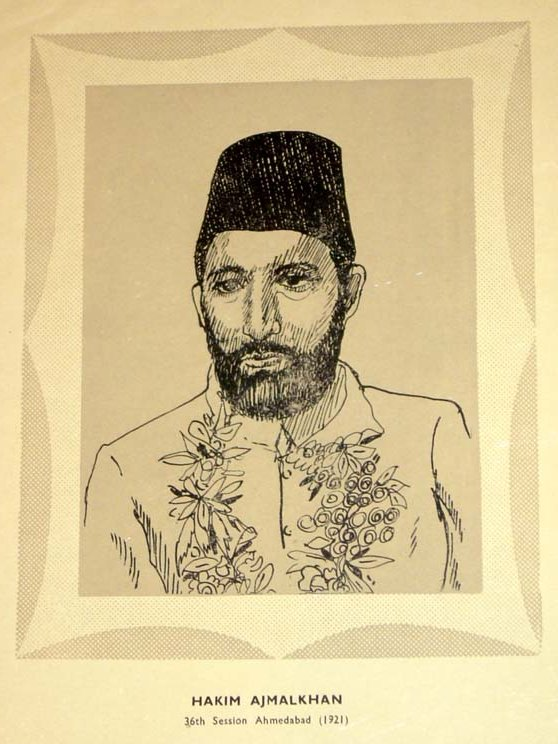
Hakim Ajmal Khan, a founder of the Muslim League, was also to become the president of the Indian National Congress in 1921.

The overwhelming, but predominantly Hindu, protest against the partition of Bengal and the fear in its wake of reforms favouring the Hindu majority led the Muslim elite in India to meet with the new viceroy, Lord Minto in 1906 and to ask for separate electorates for Muslims. In conjunction, they demanded proportional legislative representation reflecting both their status as former rulers and their record of cooperating with the British. This led, in December 1906, to the founding of the All-India Muslim League in Dacca. Although Curzon, by now, had resigned his position over a dispute with his military chief Lord Kitchener and returned to England, the League was in favour of his partition plan. The Muslim elite's position, which was reflected in the League's position, had crystallized gradually over the previous three decades, beginning with the revelations of the Census of British India in 1871, which had for the first time estimated the populations in regions of the Muslim majority (for his part, Curzon's desire to court the Muslims of East Bengal had arisen from British anxieties ever since the 1871 census—and in light of the history of Muslims fighting them in the 1857 Mutiny and the Second Anglo-Afghan War—about Indian Muslims rebelling against the Crown). In the three decades since, Muslim leaders across northern India had intermittently experienced public animosity from some of the new Hindu political and social groups. The Arya Samaj, for example, had not only supported Cow Protection Societies in their agitation, but also—distraught at the 1871 Census's Muslim numbers—organized "reconversion" events for the purpose of welcoming Muslims back to the Hindu fold. In 1905, when Tilak and Lajpat Rai attempted to rise to leadership positions in the Congress, and the Congress itself rallied around the symbolism of Kali, Muslim fears increased. It was not lost on many Muslims, for example, that the rallying cry, "Bande Mataram", had first appeared in the novel Anand Math in which Hindus had battled their Muslim oppressors. Lastly, the Muslim elite, and among it Dacca Nawab, Khwaja Salimullah, who hosted the League's first meeting in his mansion in Shahbag, was aware that a new province with a Muslim majority would directly benefit Muslims aspiring to political power.

The first steps were taken toward self-government in British India in the late 19th century with the appointment of Indian counsellors to advise the British viceroy and the establishment of provincial councils with Indian members; the British subsequently widened participation in legislative councils with the Indian Councils Act 1892. Municipal Corporations and District Boards were created for local administration; they included elected Indian members. The Indian Councils Act 1909, known as the Morley-Minto Reforms (John Morley was the Secretary of State for India, and Minto was viceroy)—gave Indians limited roles in the central and provincial legislatures. Upper-class Indians, rich landowners and businessmen, were favoured. The Muslim community was made a separate electorate and granted double representation. The goals were quite conservative, but they did advance the elective principle. The partition of Bengal was rescinded in 1911 and announced at the Delhi Durbar at which King George V came in person and was crowned Emperor of India. He announced the capital would be moved from Calcutta to Delhi. This period saw an increase in the activities of revolutionary groups, which included Bengal's Anushilan Samiti and the Punjab's Ghadar Party. However, the British authorities were able to crush violent rebels swiftly, partly because the mainstream of educated Indian politicians opposed violent revolution.

=== 1905–1911: Partition of Bengal and Swadeshi movement ===
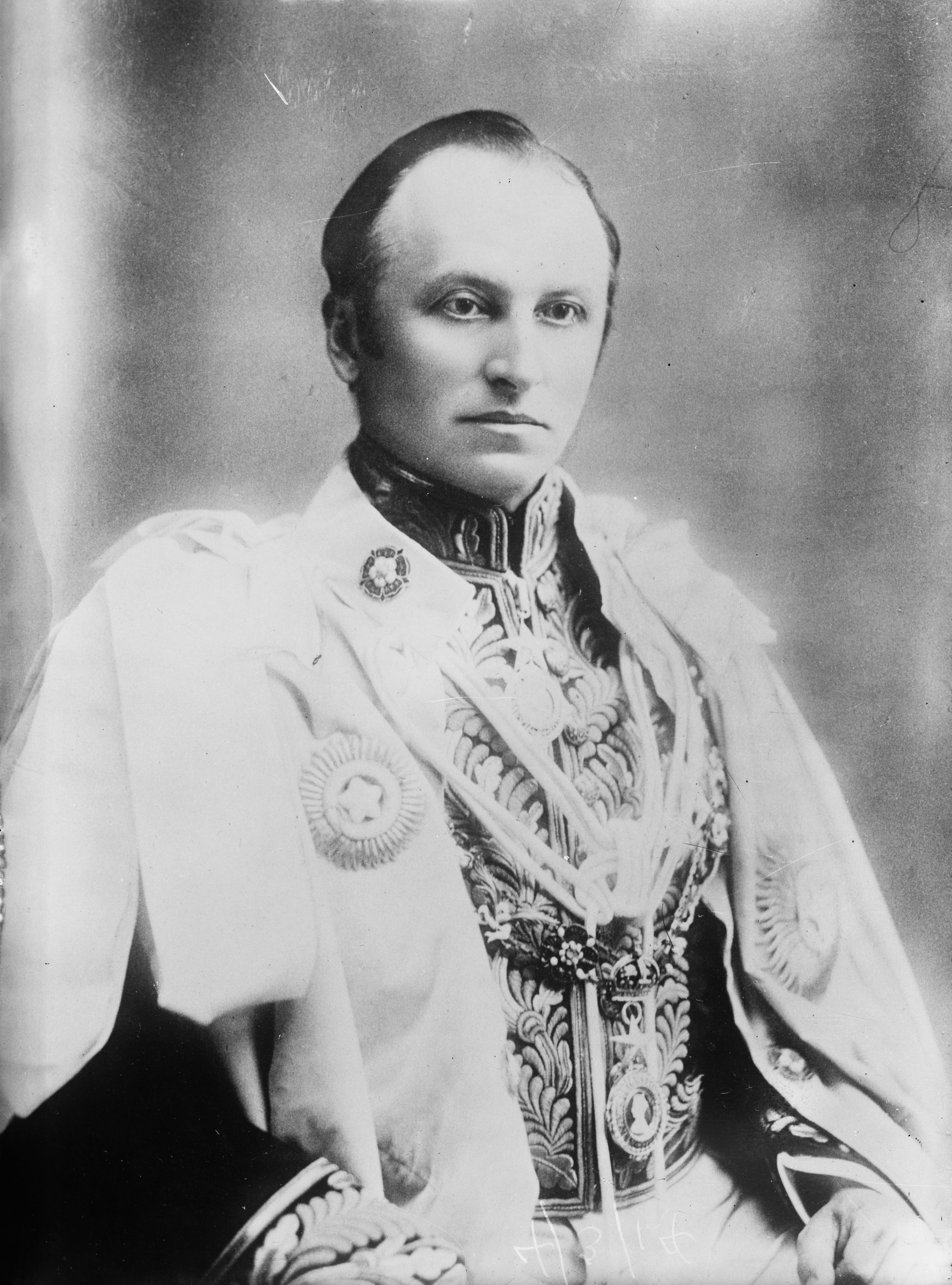
Lord Curzon, Viceroy of India, 1899–1905, who partitioned the Bengal Presidency in 1905

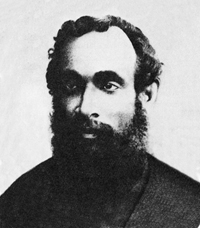
Congress moderate Sir Surendranath Banerjee led the opposition with the Swadeshi movement.

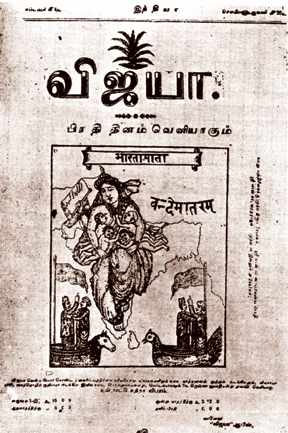
Tamil magazine, Vijaya, 1909, showing "Mother India" with her progeny and the slogan "Vande Mataram"

The viceroy, Lord Curzon (1899–1905), was unusually energetic in pursuit of efficiency and reform. His agenda included the creation of the North-West Frontier Province; small changes in the civil services; speeding up the operations of the secretariat; setting up a gold standard to ensure a stable currency; creation of a Railway Board; irrigation reform; reduction of peasant debts; lowering the cost of telegrams; archaeological research and the preservation of antiquities; improvements in the universities; police reforms; upgrading the roles of the Native States; a new Commerce and Industry Department; promotion of industry; revised land revenue policies; lowering taxes; setting up agricultural banks; creating an Agricultural Department; sponsoring agricultural research; establishing an Imperial Library; creating an Imperial Cadet Corps; new famine codes; and, indeed, reducing the smoke nuisance in Calcutta.

Trouble emerged for Curzon when he divided the largest administrative subdivision in British India, the Bengal Province, into the Muslim-majority province of Eastern Bengal and Assam and the Hindu-majority province of West Bengal (present-day Indian states of West Bengal, Bihar, and Odisha). Curzon's act, the Partition of Bengal, had been contemplated by various colonial administrations since the time of Lord William Bentinck but was never acted upon. Though some considered it administratively felicitous, it was communally charged. It sowed the seeds of division among Indians in Bengal, transforming nationalist politics as nothing else before it. The Hindu elite of Bengal, among them many who owned land in East Bengal that was leased out to Muslim peasants, protested fervidly.

Following the Partition of Bengal, which was a strategy set out by Lord Curzon to weaken the nationalist movement, Tilak encouraged the Swadeshi movement and the Boycott movement. The movement consisted of the boycott of foreign goods and also the social boycott of any Indian who used foreign goods. The Swadeshi movement consisted of the usage of natively produced goods. Once foreign goods were boycotted, there was a gap which had to be filled by the production of those goods in India itself. Bal Gangadhar Tilak said that the Swadeshi and Boycott movements are two sides of the same coin. The large Bengali Hindu middle-class (the Bhadralok), upset at the prospect of Bengalis being outnumbered in the new Bengal province by Biharis and Oriyas, felt that Curzon's act was punishment for their political assertiveness. The pervasive protests against Curzon's decision took the form predominantly of the Swadeshi ("buy Indian") campaign led by two-time Congress president, Surendranath Banerjee, and involved boycott of British goods.

The rallying cry for both types of protest was the slogan Bande Mataram ("Hail to the Mother"), which invoked a mother goddess, who stood variously for Bengal, India, and the Hindu goddess Kali. Sri Aurobindo never went beyond the law when he edited the Bande Mataram magazine; it preached independence but within the bounds of peace as far as possible. Its goal was Passive Resistance. The unrest spread from Calcutta to the surrounding regions of Bengal when students returned home to their villages and towns. Some joined local political youth clubs emerging in Bengal at the time, some engaged in robberies to fund arms, and even attempted to take the lives of Raj officials. However, the conspiracies generally failed in the face of intense police work. The Swadeshi boycott movement cut imports of British textiles by 25%. The swadeshi cloth, although more expensive and somewhat less comfortable than its Lancashire competitor, was worn as a mark of national pride by people all over India.

=== 1914–1918: First World War, Lucknow Pact, Home Rule leagues ===
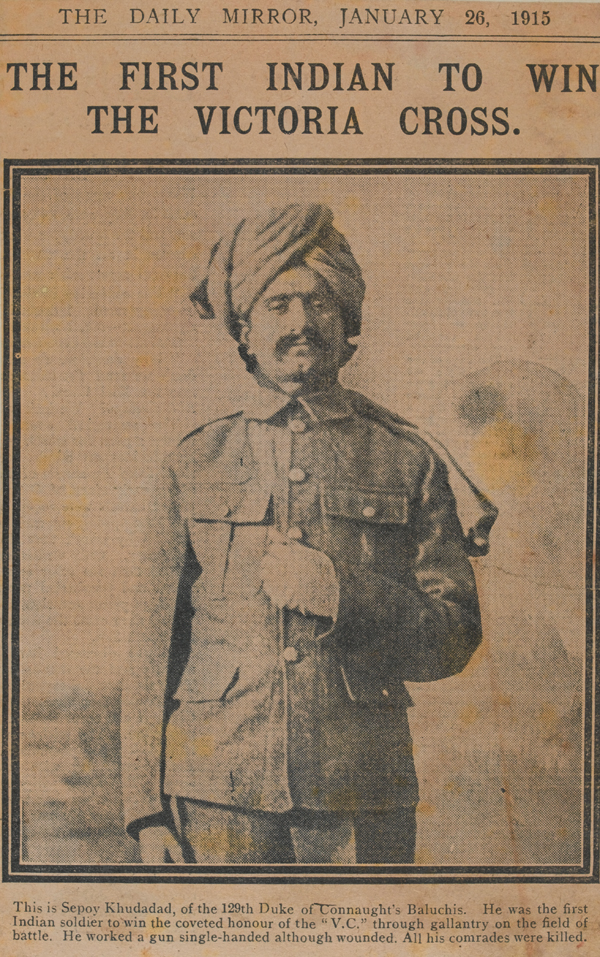
Khudadad Khan, the first Indian to be awarded the Victoria Cross, hailed from Chakwal District, Punjab (present-day Pakistan).

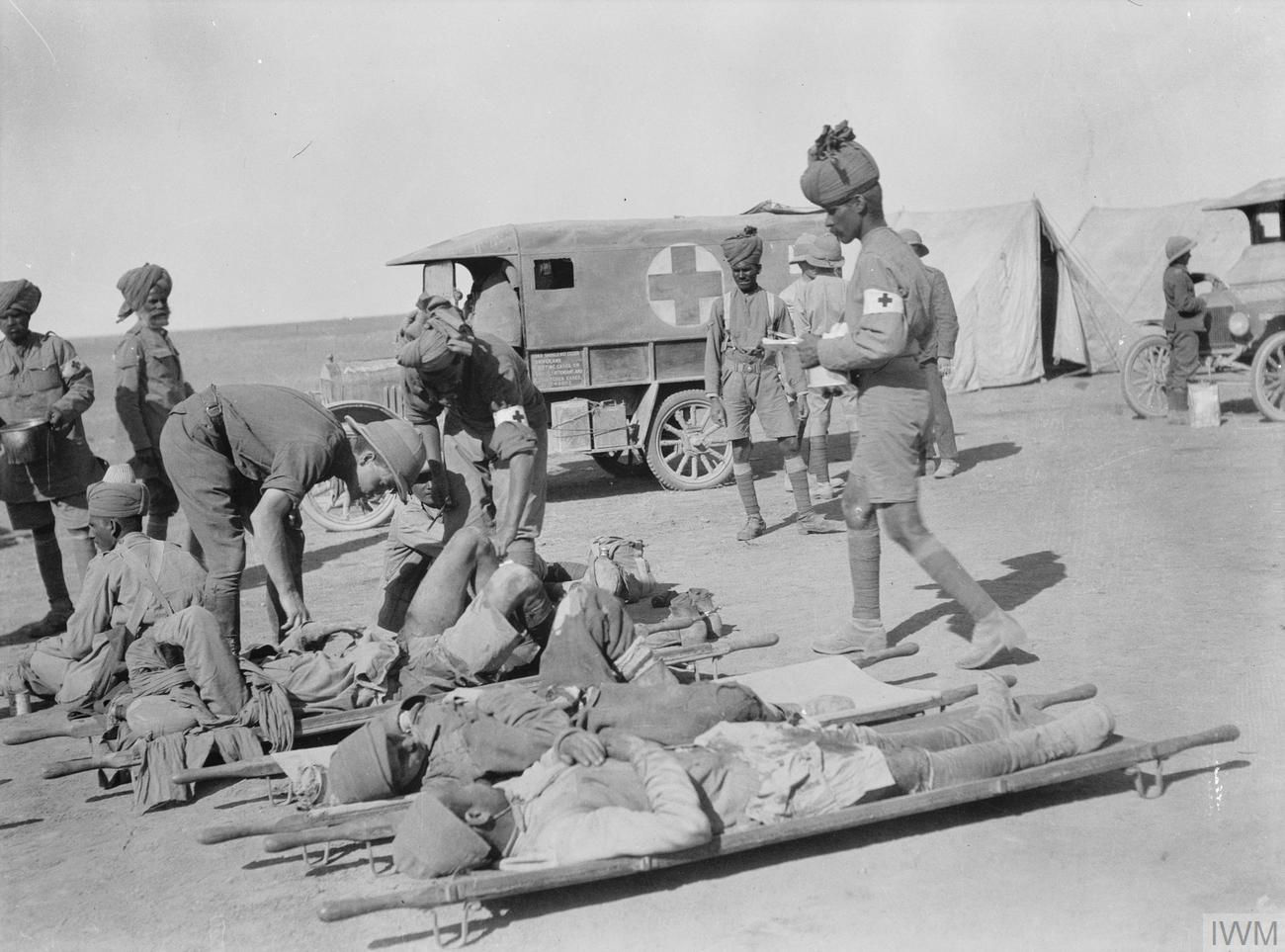
Indian medical orderlies with the Mesopotamian Expeditionary Force in Mesopotamia during World War I

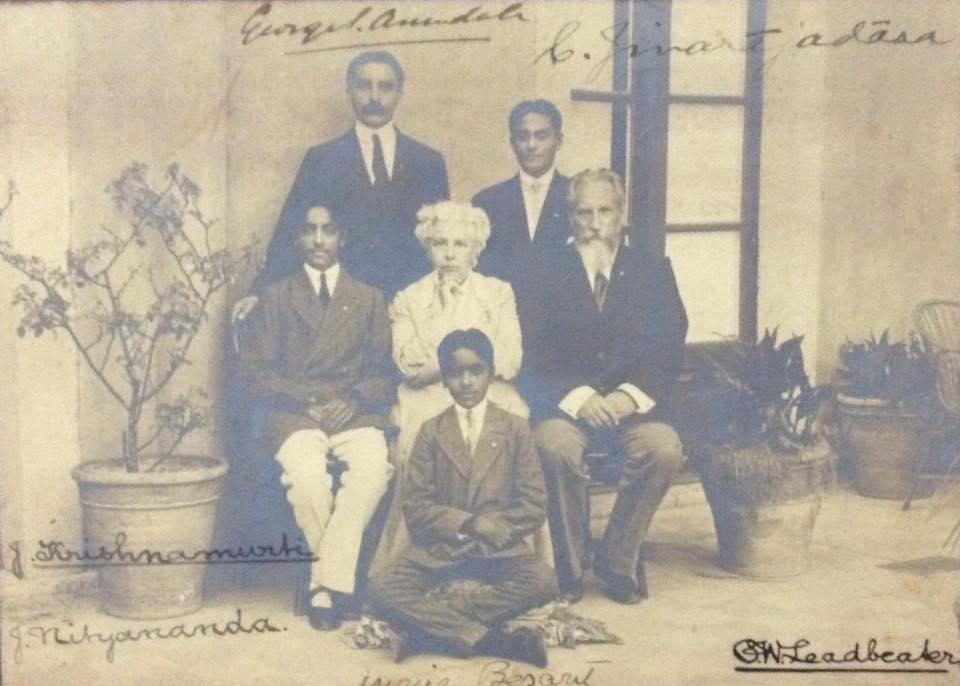
Annie Besant shown with the Theosophists in Adyar, Madras in 1912, four years before she founded an Indian Home Rule League (Note: Seated l. to r. are: Jiddhu Krisnamurthi, Besant, and Charles Webster Leadbeater.)

Muhammad Ali Jinnah, seated, third from the left, supported the Lucknow Pact in 1916, ending the Muslim League-Congress rift.

The First World War would prove to be a watershed in the imperial relationship between Britain and India. Shortly before the outbreak of war, the Government of India had indicated that they could furnish two divisions plus a cavalry brigade, with a further division in case of emergency. Some 1.4 million Indian and British soldiers of the British Indian Army took part in the war, primarily in Iraq and the Middle East. Their participation had a wider cultural fallout as news spread of how bravely soldiers fought and died alongside British soldiers, as well as soldiers from dominions like Canada and Australia. India's international profile rose during the 1920s, as it became a founding member of the League of Nations in 1920 and participated, under the name "Les Indes Anglaises" (British India), in the 1920 Summer Olympics in Antwerp. Back in India, especially among the leaders of the Indian National Congress, the war led to calls for greater self-government for Indians.

At the onset of World War I, the reassignment of most of the British army in India to Europe and Mesopotamia, had led the previous viceroy, Lord Harding, to worry about the "risks involved in denuding India of troops". Revolutionary violence had already been a concern in British India; consequently, in 1915, to strengthen its powers during what it saw was a time of increased vulnerability, the Government of India passed the Defence of India Act 1915, which allowed it to intern politically dangerous dissidents without due process, and added to the power it already had under the Indian Press Act, 1910 to imprison journalists without trial and to censor the press. It was under the Defence of India Act that the Ali brothers were imprisoned in 1916, and Annie Besant, a European woman, and ordinarily more problematic to imprison, was arrested in 1917. Now, as constitutional reform began to be discussed in earnest, the British began to consider how new moderate Indians could be brought into the fold of constitutional politics and, simultaneously, how the hand of established constitutionalists could be strengthened. However, since the Government of India wanted to ensure against any sabotage of the reform process by extremists, and since its reform plan was devised during a time when extremist violence had ebbed as a result of increased governmental control, it also began to consider how some of its wartime powers could be extended into peacetime.

After the 1906 split between the moderates and the extremists in the Indian National Congress, organised political activity by the Congress had remained fragmented until 1914, when Bal Gangadhar Tilak was released from prison and began to sound out other Congress leaders about possible reunification. That, however, had to wait until the demise of Tilak's principal moderate opponents, Gopal Krishna Gokhale and Pherozeshah Mehta, in 1915, whereupon an agreement was reached for Tilak's ousted group to re-enter the Congress. In the 1916 Lucknow session of the Congress, Tilak's supporters were able to push through a more radical resolution which asked for the British to declare that it was their "aim and intention ... to confer self-government on India at an early date". Soon, other such rumblings began to appear in public pronouncements: in 1917, in the Imperial Legislative Council, Madan Mohan Malaviya spoke of the expectations the war had generated in India, "I venture to say that the war has put the clock ... fifty years forward ... (The) reforms after the war will have to be such, ... as will satisfy the aspirations of her (India's) people to take their legitimate part in the administration of their own country."

The 1916 Lucknow Session of the Congress was also the venue of an unanticipated mutual effort by the Congress and the Muslim League, the occasion for which was provided by the wartime partnership between Germany and Turkey. Since the Turkish Sultan, or Khalifah, had also sporadically claimed guardianship of the Islamic holy sites of Mecca, Medina, and Jerusalem, and since the British and their allies were now in conflict with Turkey, doubts began to increase among some Indian Muslims about the "religious neutrality" of the British, doubts that had already surfaced as a result of the reunification of Bengal in 1911, a decision that was seen as ill-disposed to Muslims. In the Lucknow Pact, the League joined the Congress in the proposal for greater self-government that was campaigned for by Tilak and his supporters; in return, the Congress accepted separate electorates for Muslims in the provincial legislatures as well as the Imperial Legislative Council. In 1916, the Muslim League had anywhere between 500 and 800 members and did not yet have the wider following among Indian Muslims that it enjoyed in later years; in the League itself, the pact did not have unanimous backing, having largely been negotiated by a group of "Young Party" Muslims from the United Provinces (UP), most prominently, two brothers Mohammad and Shaukat Ali, who had embraced the Pan-Islamic cause; however, it did have the support of a young lawyer from Bombay, Muhammad Ali Jinnah, who was later to rise to leadership roles in both the League and the Indian independence movement. In later years, as the full ramifications of the pact unfolded, it was seen as benefiting the Muslim minority élites of provinces like UP and Bihar more than the Muslim majorities of Punjab and Bengal; nonetheless, at the time, the "Lucknow Pact" was an important milestone in nationalistic agitation and was seen as such by the British.

During 1916, two Home Rule Leagues were founded within the Indian National Congress by Tilak and Annie Besant, respectively, to promote Home Rule among Indians, and also to elevate the stature of the founders within the Congress itself. Besant, for her part, was also keen to demonstrate the superiority of this new form of organised agitation, which had achieved some success in the Irish home rule movement, over the political violence that had intermittently plagued the subcontinent during the years 1907–1914. The two Leagues focused their attention on complementary geographical regions: Tilak's in western India, in the southern Bombay presidency, and Besant's in the rest of the country, but especially in the Madras Presidency and in regions like Sind and Gujarat that had hitherto been considered politically dormant by the Congress. Both leagues rapidly acquired new members—approximately thirty thousand each in a little over a year—and began to publish inexpensive newspapers. Their propaganda also turned to posters, pamphlets, and political-religious songs, and later to mass meetings, which not only attracted greater numbers than in earlier Congress sessions, but also entirely new social groups such as non-Brahmins, traders, farmers, students, and lower-level government workers. Although they did not achieve the magnitude or character of a nationwide mass movement, the Home Rule leagues both deepened and widened organised political agitation for self-rule in India. The British authorities reacted by imposing restrictions on the Leagues, including shutting out students from meetings and banning the two leaders from travelling to certain provinces.

=== 1915–1918: return of Gandhi ===
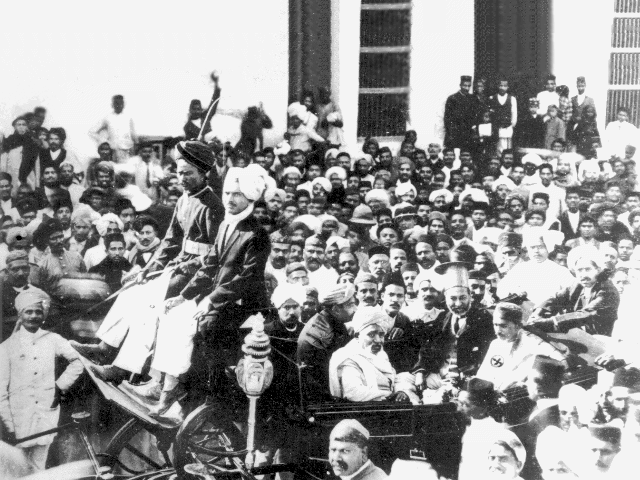
Mahatma Gandhi (seated in carriage, on the right, eyes downcast, with black flat-top hat) receiving a big welcome in Karachi in 1916 after his return to India from South Africa

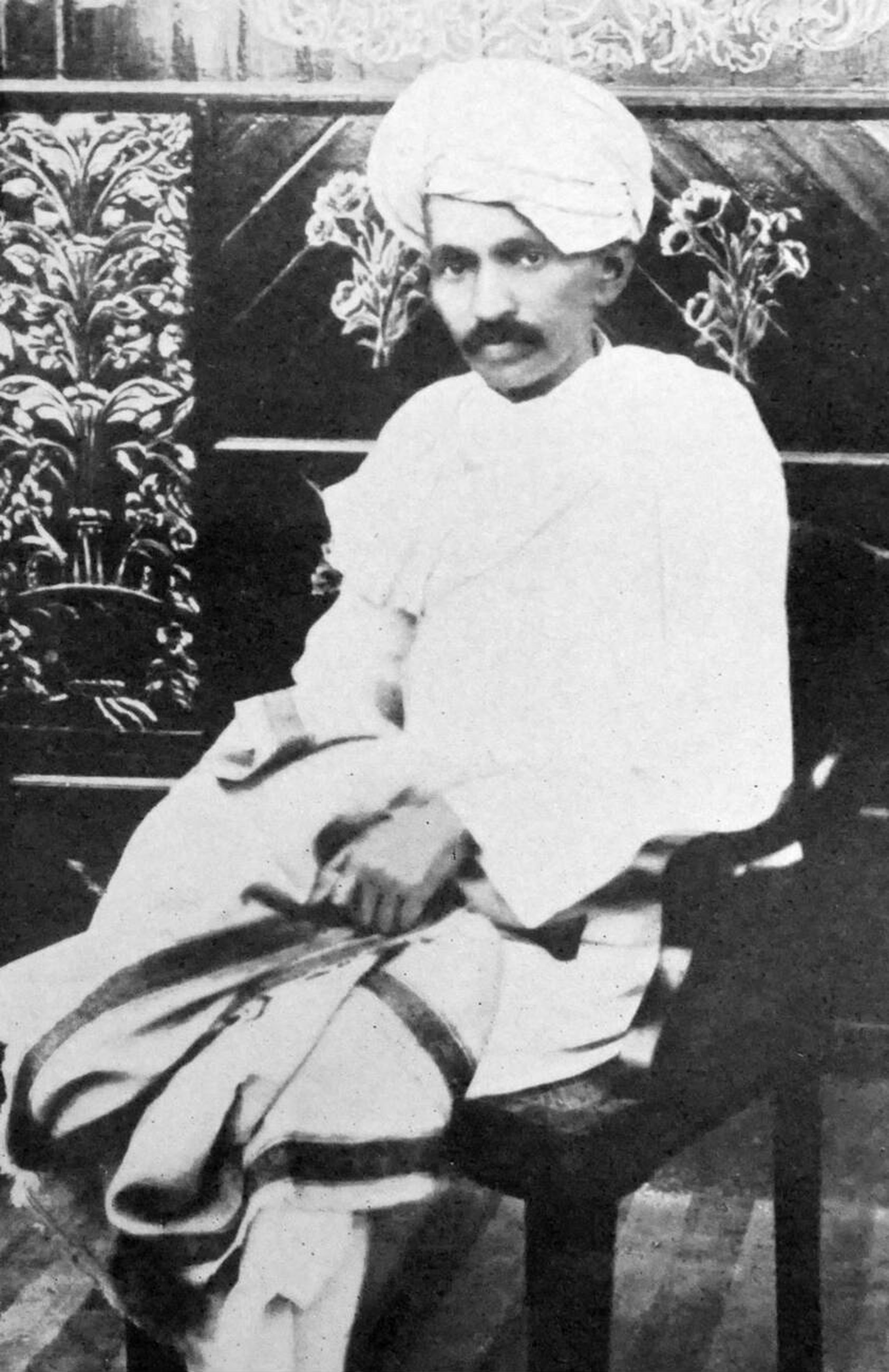
Gandhi at the time of the Kheda Satyagraha, 1918

The year 1915 also saw the return of Mohandas Karamchand Gandhi to India. Already known in India as a result of his civil liberties protests on behalf of the Indians in South Africa, Gandhi followed the advice of his mentor Gopal Krishna Gokhale and chose not to make any public pronouncements during the first year of his return, but instead spent the year travelling, observing the country at first hand, and writing. Earlier, during his South Africa sojourn, Gandhi, a lawyer by profession, had represented an Indian community, which, although small, was sufficiently diverse to be a microcosm of India itself. In tackling the challenge of holding this community together and simultaneously confronting the colonial authority, he had created a technique of non-violent resistance, which he labelled Satyagraha (or Striving for Truth). For Gandhi, Satyagraha was different from "passive resistance", by then a familiar technique of social protest, which he regarded as a practical strategy adopted by the weak in the face of superior force; Satyagraha, on the other hand, was for him the "last resort of those strong enough in their commitment to truth to undergo suffering in its cause". Ahimsa or "non-violence", which formed the underpinning of Satyagraha, came to represent the twin pillar, with Truth, of Gandhi's unorthodox religious outlook on life. During the years 1907–1914, Gandhi tested the technique of Satyagraha in several protests on behalf of the Indian community in South Africa against the unjust racial laws.

Also, during his time in South Africa, in his essay, Hind Swaraj, (1909), Gandhi formulated his vision of Swaraj, or "self-rule" for India based on three vital ingredients: solidarity between Indians of different faiths, but most of all between Hindus and Muslims; the removal of untouchability from Indian society; and the exercise of swadeshi—the boycott of manufactured foreign goods and the revival of Indian cottage industry. The first two, he felt, were essential for India to be an egalitarian and tolerant society, one befitting the principles of Truth and Ahimsa, while the last, by making Indians more self-reliant, would break the cycle of dependence that was perpetuating not only the direction and tenor of the British rule in India, but also the British commitment to it. At least until 1920, the British presence itself was not a stumbling block in Gandhi's conception of swaraj; rather, it was the inability of Indians to create a modern society.

Gandhi made his political debut in India in 1917 in Champaran district in Bihar, near the Nepal border, where he was invited by a group of disgruntled tenant farmers who, for many years, had been forced into planting indigo (for dyes) on a portion of their land and then selling it at below-market prices to the British planters who had leased them the land. Upon his arrival in the district, Gandhi was joined by other agitators, including a young Congress leader, Rajendra Prasad, from Bihar, who would become a loyal supporter of Gandhi and go on to play a prominent role in the Indian independence movement. When Gandhi was ordered to leave by the local British authorities, he refused on moral grounds, setting up his refusal as a form of individual Satyagraha. Soon, under pressure from the Viceroy in Delhi who was anxious to maintain domestic peace during wartime, the provincial government rescinded Gandhi's expulsion order, and later agreed to an official enquiry into the case. Although the British planters eventually gave in, they were not won over to the farmers' cause, and thereby did not produce the optimal outcome of a Satyagraha that Gandhi had hoped for; similarly, the farmers themselves, although pleased at the resolution, responded less than enthusiastically to the concurrent projects of rural empowerment and education that Gandhi had inaugurated in keeping with his ideal of swaraj. The following year Gandhi launched two more Satyagrahas—both in his native Gujarat—one in the rural Kaira district where land-owning farmers were protesting increased land-revenue and the other in the city of Ahmedabad, where workers in an Indian-owned textile mill were distressed about their low wages. The satyagraha in Ahmedabad took the form of Gandhi fasting and supporting the workers in a strike, which eventually led to a settlement. In Kaira, in contrast, although the farmers' cause received publicity from Gandhi's presence, the satyagraha itself, which consisted of the farmers' collective decision to withhold payment, was not immediately successful, as the British authorities refused to back down. The agitation in Kaira gained for Gandhi another lifelong lieutenant in Sardar Vallabhbhai Patel, who had organised the farmers, and who too would go on to play a leadership role in the Indian independence movement.

=== 1916–1919: Montagu–Chelmsford reforms ===
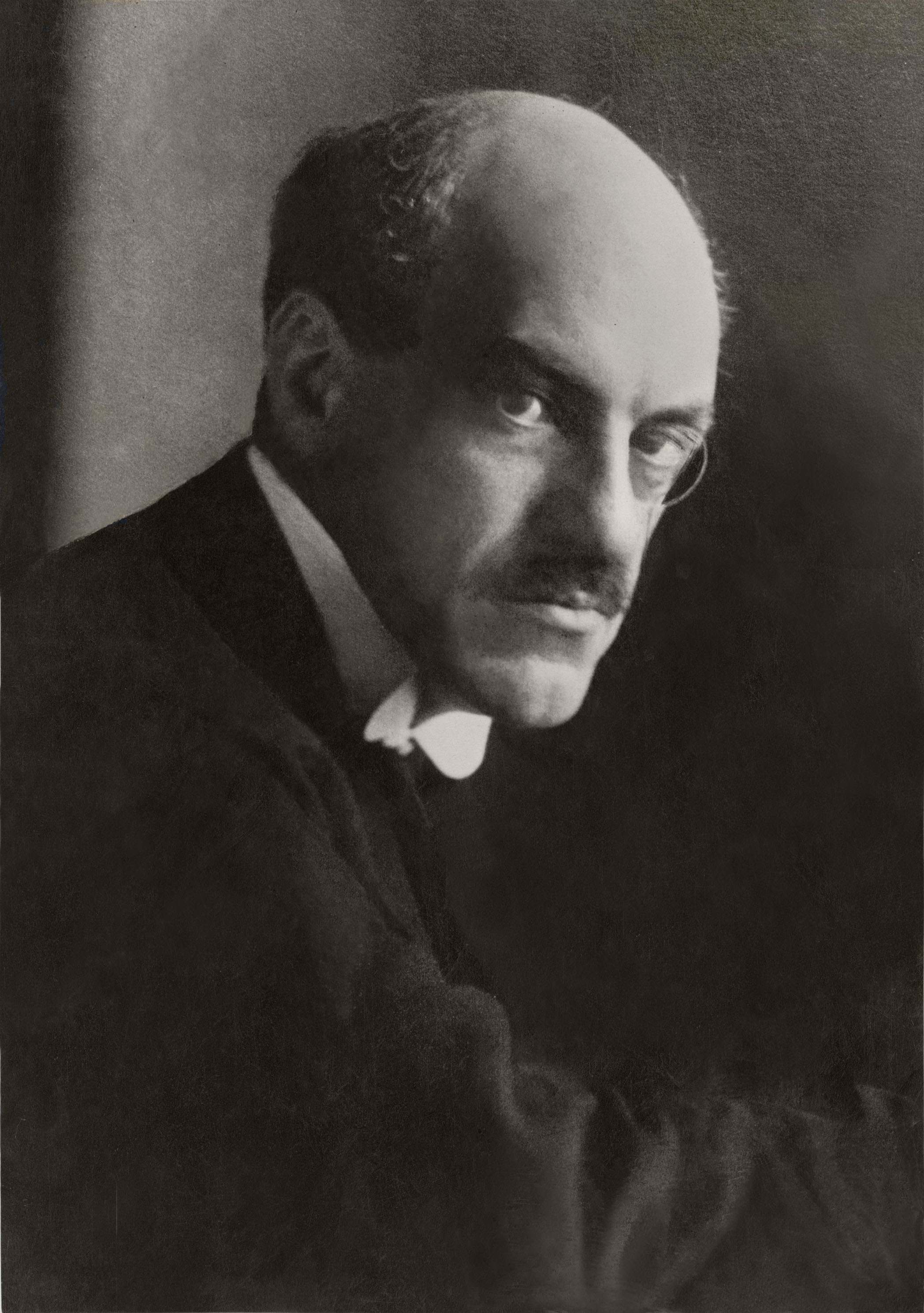
Edwin Montagu, the Secretary of State for India, whose report led to the Government of India Act 1919, also known as the Montford Reforms or the Montagu-Chelmsford Reforms

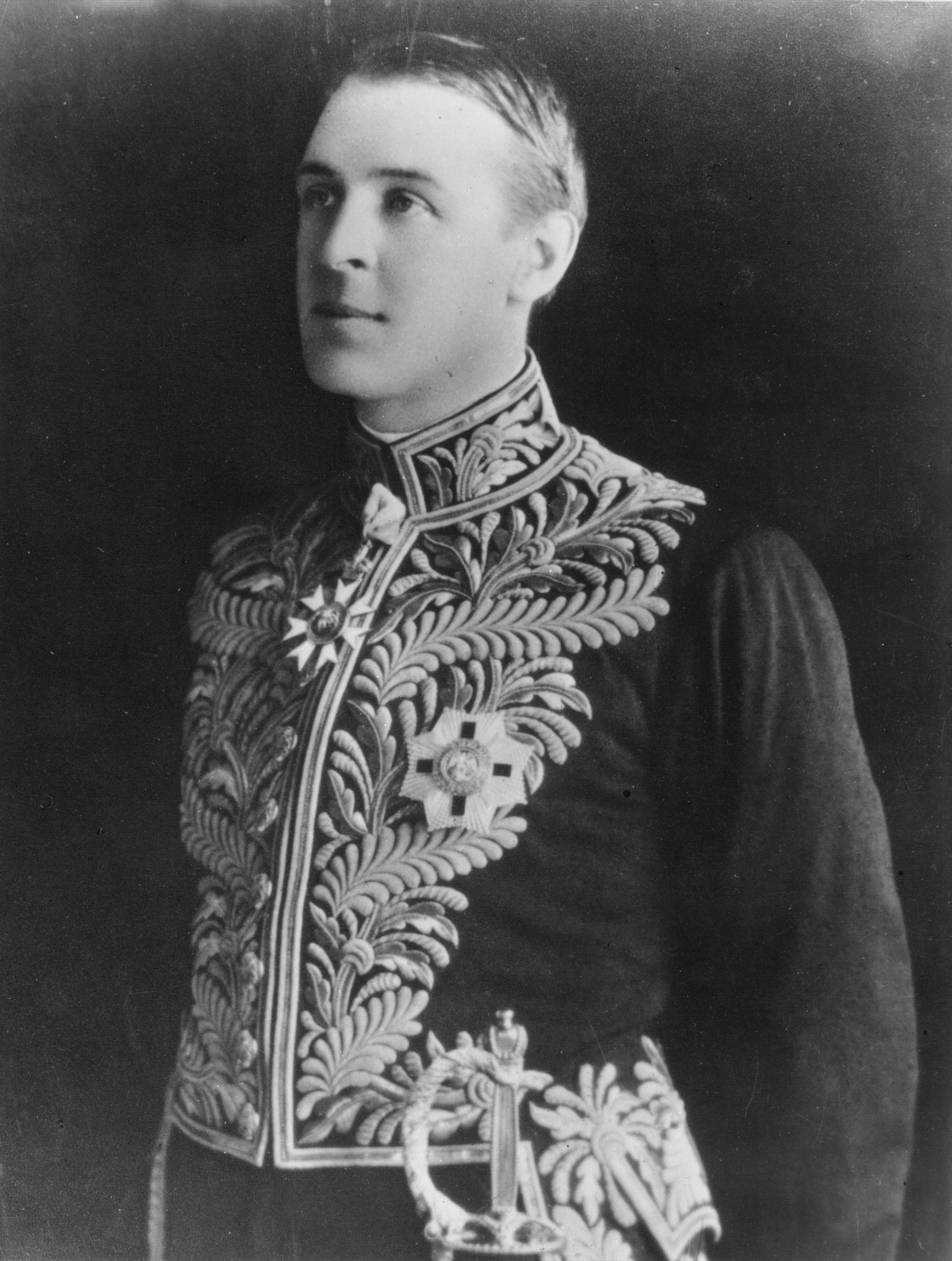
Lord Chelmsford, viceroy of India, who cautioned the British Government to be more responsive to Indian public opinion

In 1916, in the face of new strength demonstrated by the nationalists with the signing of the Lucknow Pact and the founding of the Home Rule leagues, and the realisation, after the disaster in the Mesopotamian campaign, that the war would likely last longer, the new viceroy, Lord Chelmsford, cautioned that the Government of India needed to be more responsive to Indian opinion. Towards the end of the year, after discussions with the government in London, he suggested that the British demonstrate their good faith—in light of the Indian war role—through several public actions, including awards of titles and honours to princes, granting of commissions in the army to Indians, and removal of the much-reviled cotton excise duty, but, most importantly, an announcement of Britain's plans for India and an indication of some concrete steps. After more discussion, in August 1917, the new Liberal secretary of state for India, Edwin Montagu, announced the British aim of "increasing association of Indians in every branch of the administration, and the gradual development of self-governing institutions, with a view to the progressive realisation of responsible government in India as an integral part of the British Empire". Although the plan envisioned limited self-government at first only in the provinces—with India emphatically within the British Empire—it represented the first British proposal for any form of representative government in a non-white colony.

Montagu and Chelmsford presented their report in July 1918 after a long fact-finding trip through India the previous winter. After more discussion by the government and parliament in Britain, and another tour by the Franchise and Functions Committee for the purpose of identifying who among the Indian population could vote in future elections, the Government of India Act 1919 (also known as the Montagu–Chelmsford Reforms) was passed in December 1919. The new Act enlarged both the provincial and Imperial legislative councils and repealed the Government of India's recourse to the "official majority" in unfavourable votes. Although departments like defence, foreign affairs, criminal law, communications, and income-tax were retained by the Viceroy and the central government in New Delhi, other departments like public health, education, land-revenue, and local self-government were transferred to the provinces. The provinces themselves were now to be administered under a new diarchical system, whereby some areas like education, agriculture, infrastructure development, and local self-government became the preserve of Indian ministers and legislatures, and ultimately the Indian electorates, while others like irrigation, land-revenue, police, prisons, and control of media remained within the purview of the British governor and his executive council. The new Act also made it easier for Indians to be admitted into the civil services and the army officer corps.

A greater number of Indians were now enfranchised, although, for voting at the national level, they constituted only 10% of the total adult male population, many of whom were still illiterate. In the provincial legislatures, the British continued to exercise some control by setting aside seats for special interests they considered cooperative or useful. In particular, rural candidates, generally sympathetic to British rule and less confrontational, were assigned more seats than their urban counterparts. Seats were also reserved for non-Brahmins, landowners, businessmen, and college graduates. The principal of "communal representation", an integral part of the Minto–Morley Reforms, and more recently of the Congress-Muslim League Lucknow Pact, was reaffirmed, with seats being reserved for Muslims, Sikhs, Indian Christians, Anglo-Indians, and domiciled Europeans, in both provincial and Imperial legislative councils. The Montagu–Chelmsford reforms offered Indians the most significant opportunity yet for exercising legislative power, especially at the provincial level; however, that opportunity was also restricted by the still limited number of eligible voters, by the small budgets available to provincial legislatures, and by the presence of rural and special interest seats that were seen as instruments of British control. Its scope was unsatisfactory to the Indian political leadership, famously expressed by Annie Besant as something "unworthy of England to offer and India to accept".

=== 1917–1919: Rowlatt Act ===
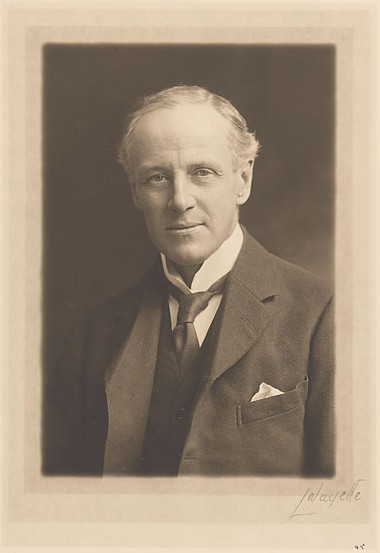
Sidney Rowlatt, the British judge under whose chairmanship the Rowlatt Committee recommended stricter anti-sedition laws

In 1917, as Montagu and Chelmsford were compiling their report, a committee chaired by a British judge, Sidney Rowlatt, and was tasked with investigating "revolutionary conspiracies", with the unstated goal of extending the government's wartime powers. The Rowlatt Committee comprised four British and two Indian members, including Sir Basil Scott and Diwan Bahadur Sir C. V. Kumaraswami Sastri, the present and future Chief Justices of the High Court of Bombay and the High Court of Madras. It presented its report in July 1918 and identified three regions of conspiratorial insurgency: Bengal, the Bombay presidency, and the Punjab. To combat subversive acts in these regions, the committee unanimously recommended that the government use emergency powers akin to its wartime authority, which included the ability to try cases of sedition by a panel of three judges and without juries, exaction of securities from suspects, governmental overseeing of residences of suspects, and the power for provincial governments to detain suspects without trial.

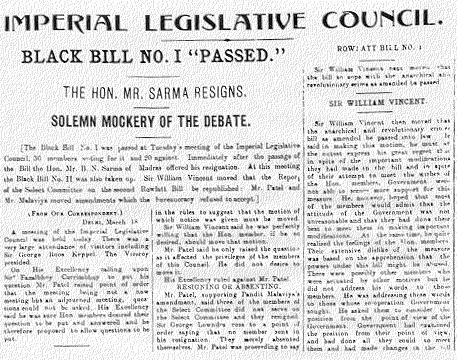
Headlines about the Rowlatt Bills (1919) from a nationalist newspaper in India. Although all non-official Indians on the Legislative Council voted against the Rowlatt Bills, the government was able to force their passage by using its majority.

With the end of World War I, there was also a change in the economic climate. By the end of 1919, 1.5 million Indians had served in the armed services in either combatant or non-combatant roles, and India had provided £146 million in revenue for the war. The increased taxes coupled with disruptions in both domestic and international trade had the effect of approximately doubling the index of overall prices in India between 1914 and 1920. Returning war veterans, especially in the Punjab, created a growing unemployment crisis, and post-war inflation led to food riots in Bombay, Madras, and Bengal provinces, a situation that was made only worse by the failure of the 1918–19 monsoon and by profiteering and speculation. The global influenza epidemic and the Bolshevik Revolution of 1917 added to the general jitters; the former among the population already experiencing economic woes, and the latter among government officials, fearing a similar revolution in India.

To combat what it saw as a coming crisis, the government now drafted the Rowlatt committee's recommendations into two Rowlatt Bills. Although the bills were authorised for legislative consideration by Edwin Montagu, they were done so unwillingly, with the accompanying declaration, "I loathe the suggestion at first sight of preserving the Defence of India Act in peacetime to such an extent as Rowlatt and his friends think necessary." In the ensuing discussion and vote in the Imperial Legislative Council, all Indian members voiced opposition to the bills. The Government of India was, nevertheless, able to use its "official majority" to ensure passage of the bills early in 1919. However, what it passed, in deference to the Indian opposition, was a lesser version of the first bill, which now allowed extrajudicial powers, but for a period of exactly three years and for the prosecution solely of "anarchical and revolutionary movements", dropping entirely the second bill involving modification the Indian Penal Code. Even so, when it was passed, the new Rowlatt Act aroused widespread indignation throughout India, and brought Gandhi to the forefront of the nationalist movement.

=== 1919–1929: Jallianwala and non-cooperation movement ===
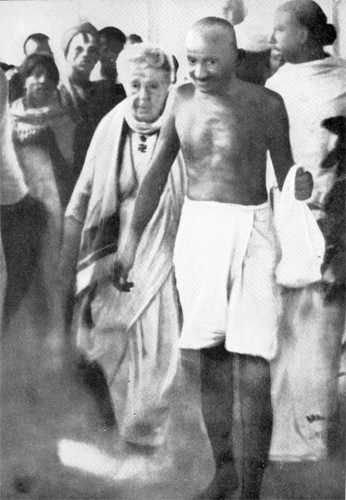
Gandhi with Besant en route to a meeting in Madras in September 1921. Earlier, in Madurai, on 21 September 1921, Gandhi had adopted the loin-cloth in identification with India's poor.

Poster advertising a Congress non-co-operation "Public Meeting" and a "Bonfire of Foreign Clothes" in Bombay, early 1920s, and expressing support for the "Karachi Khilafat Conference"

Hindus and Muslims, with flags of Indian National Congress and the Muslim League, collecting clothes to be burnt as a part of the non-cooperation movement

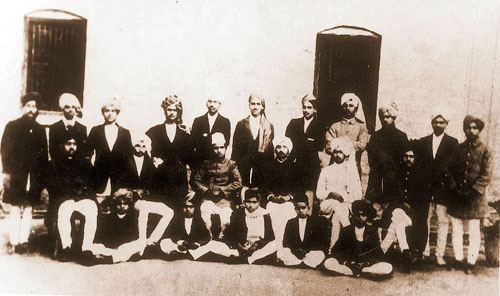
Staff and students, National College, Lahore, founded in 1921 by Lala Lajpat Rai after the non-co-operation movement. Standing, fourth from right, is Bhagat Singh.

The Jallianwala Bagh massacre or "Amritsar massacre", took place in the Jallianwala Bagh public garden in the predominantly Sikh northern city of Amritsar. After days of unrest, Brigadier-General Reginald E.H. Dyer forbade public meetings, and on Sunday 13 April 1919 fifty British Indian Army soldiers commanded by Dyer began shooting at an unarmed gathering of thousands of men, women, and children without warning. Casualty estimates vary widely, with the Government of India reporting 379 dead, with 1,100 wounded. The Indian National Congress estimated three times the number of dead. Dyer was removed from duty but he became a celebrated hero in Britain among people with connections to the Raj. Historians consider the episode was a decisive step towards the end of British rule in India.

In 1920, after the British government refused to back down, Gandhi began his campaign of non-cooperation, prompting many Indians to return British awards and honours, to resign from the civil services, and to again boycott British goods. In addition, Gandhi reorganised the Congress, transforming it into a mass movement and opening its membership to even the poorest Indians. Although Gandhi halted the non-cooperation movement in 1922 after the violent incident at Chauri Chaura, the movement revived again in the mid-1920s.

The visit, in 1928, of the British Simon Commission, charged with instituting constitutional reform in India, resulted in widespread protests throughout the country. Earlier, in 1925, non-violent protests of the Congress had resumed too, this time in Gujarat, and led by Patel, who organised farmers to refuse payment of increased land taxes; the success of this protest, the Bardoli Satyagraha, brought Gandhi back into the fold of active politics. At its annual session in Lahore, the Indian National Congress, under the presidency of Jawaharlal Nehru, issued a demand for Purna Swaraj (Hindustani language: "complete independence"), or Purna Swarajya. The declaration was drafted by the Congress Working Committee, which included Gandhi, Nehru, Patel, and Chakravarthi Rajagopalachari. Gandhi subsequently led an expanded movement of civil disobedience, culminating in 1930 with the Salt Satyagraha, in which thousands of Indians defied the tax on salt by marching to the sea and making their own salt by evaporating seawater. Although many, including Gandhi, were arrested, the British government eventually gave in, and in 1931 Gandhi travelled to London to negotiate new reform at the Round Table Conferences.

=== Government of India Act, 1935 ===
In local terms, British control rested on the Indian Civil Service (ICS), but it faced growing difficulties. Fewer and fewer young men in Britain were interested in joining, and the continuing distrust of Indians resulted in a declining base in terms of quality and quantity. By 1945, Indians were numerically dominant in the ICS, and at issue was divided loyalty between the Empire and independence. The finances of the Raj depended on land taxes, and these became problematic in the 1930s. Epstein argues that after 1919 it became harder and harder to collect the land revenue. The Raj's suppression of civil disobedience after 1934 temporarily increased the power of the revenue agents, but after 1937 they were forced by the new Congress-controlled provincial governments to hand back confiscated land. Again, the outbreak of war strengthened them; in the face of the Quit India movement, the revenue collectors had to rely on military force and by 1946–47 direct British control was rapidly disappearing in much of the countryside.

In 1935, after the Round Table Conferences, Parliament passed the Government of India Act 1935, which authorised the establishment of independent legislative assemblies in all provinces of British India, the creation of a central government incorporating both the British provinces and the princely states, and the protection of Muslim minorities. The future Constitution of independent India was based on this Act. However, it divided the electorate into 19 religious and social categories, e.g., Muslims, Sikhs, Indian Christians, Depressed Classes, Landholders, Commerce and Industry, Europeans, Anglo-Indians, etc., each of which was given separate representation in the Provincial Legislative Assemblies. A voter could cast a vote only for candidates in his own category.

The 1935 Act provided for more autonomy for Indian provinces, to cool off nationalist sentiment. The Act provided for a national parliament and an executive branch under the purview of the British government, but the rulers of the princely states managed to block its implementation. These states remained under the full control of their hereditary rulers, with no popular government. To prepare for elections Congress built up its grass roots membership from 473,000 in 1935 to 4.5 million in 1939. In the 1937 elections Congress won victories in seven of the eleven provinces of British India. Congress governments, with wide powers, were formed in these provinces. The widespread voter support for the Indian National Congress surprised Raj officials, who previously had seen the Congress as a small elitist body. The British separated Burma Province from British India in 1937 and granted the colony a new constitution calling for a fully elected assembly, with many powers given to the Burmese, but this proved to be a divisive issue as a ploy to exclude Burmese from any further Indian reforms.

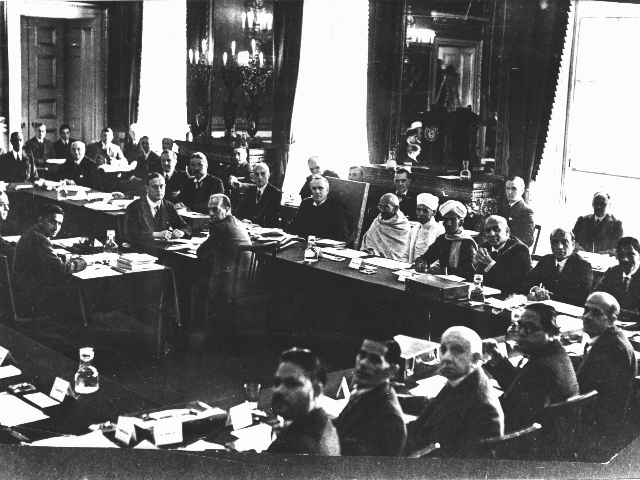
The Second Round Table Conference showing Gandhi and British prime minister, Ramsay MacDonald, Samuel Hoare and B. R. Ambedkar.

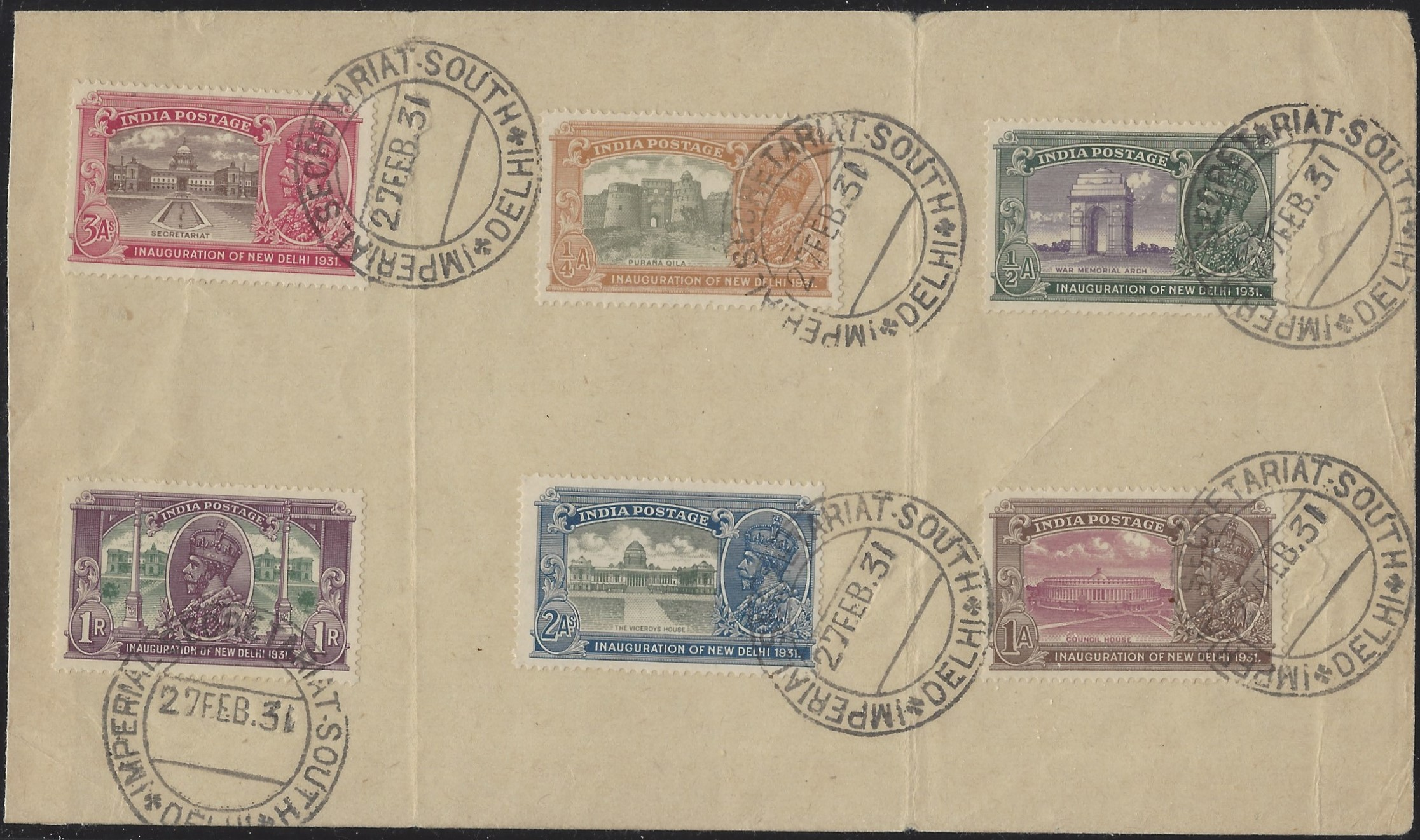
A second-day cancellation of the series "Inauguration of New Delhi", 27 February 1931, commemorating the new city designed by Sir Edwin Lutyens and Sir Herbert Baker

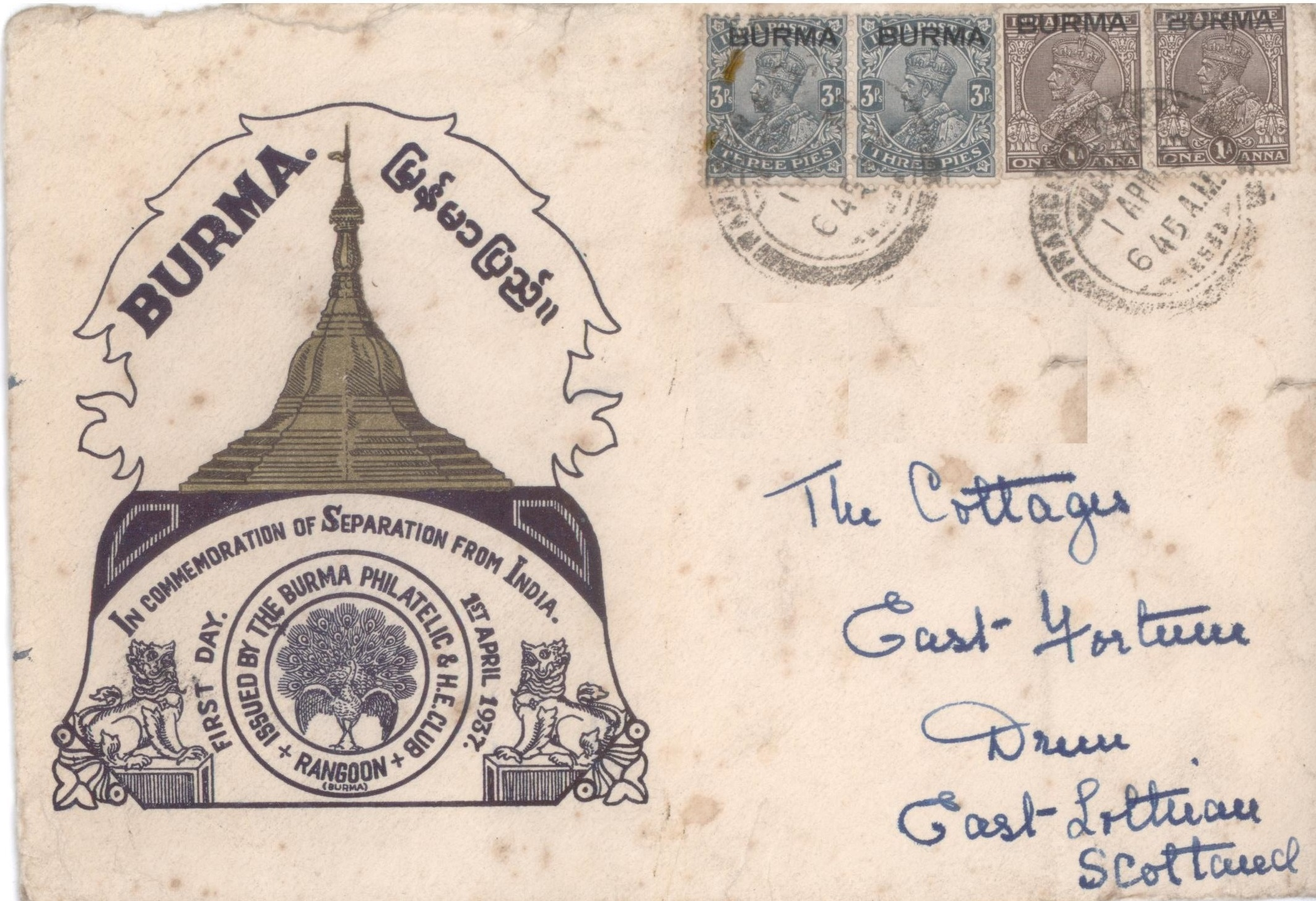
A first-day cover issued on 1 April 1937 commemorating the separation of Burma from the British Indian Empire

=== 1939–1945: World War II ===
With the outbreak of World War II in 1939, the viceroy, Lord Linlithgow, declared war on India's behalf without consulting Indian leaders, leading the Congress provincial ministries to resign in protest. The Muslim League, in contrast, supported Britain in the war effort and maintained its control of the government in three major provinces, Bengal, Sind and the Punjab. While the Muslim League had been a small elite group in 1927 with only 1300 members, it grew rapidly once it became an organisation that reached out to the masses, reaching 500,000 members in Bengal in 1944, 200,000 in Punjab, and hundreds of thousands elsewhere. Jinnah was now well positioned to negotiate with the British from a position of power. Jinnah repeatedly warned that Muslims would be unfairly treated in an independent India dominated by the Congress. On 24 March 1940 in Lahore, the League passed the "Lahore Resolution", demanding that, "the areas in which the Muslims are numerically in majority as in the North-Western and Eastern zones of India should be grouped to constitute independent states in which the constituent units shall be autonomous and sovereign." Although there were other important national Muslim politicians such as Congress leader Ab'ul Kalam Azad, and influential regional Muslim politicians such as A. K. Fazlul Huq of the leftist Krishak Praja Party in Bengal, Fazl-i-Hussain of the landlord-dominated Punjab Unionist Party, and Abd al-Ghaffar Khan of the pro-Congress Khudai Khidmatgar (popularly, "red shirts") in the North West Frontier Province, the British, over the next six years, were to increasingly see the League as the main representative of Muslim India.

The Congress was secular and strongly opposed to having any religious state. It insisted there was a natural unity to India, and repeatedly blamed the British for "divide and rule" tactics based on prompting Muslims to think of themselves as alien from Hindus. Jinnah rejected the notion of a united India, and emphasized that religious communities were more basic than an artificial nationalism. He proclaimed the Two-Nation Theory, stating at Lahore on 23 March 1940:

[Islam and Hinduism] are not religions in the strict sense of the word, but are, in fact, different and distinct social orders, and it is a dream that the Hindus and Muslims can ever evolve a common nationality ... The Hindu and Muslim belong to two different religions, philosophies, social customs and literature [sic]. They neither intermarry nor interdine together and indeed they belong to two different civilizations which are based mainly on conflicting ideas and conceptions. Their aspects of life are different ... To yoke together two such nations under a single state, one as a numerical minority and the other as a majority, must lead to growing discontent and final destruction of any fabric that may be so built up for the government of such a state.

While the regular Indian army in 1939 included about 220,000 native troops, it expanded tenfold during the war, and small naval and air force units were created. Over two million Indians volunteered for military service in the British Army. They played a major role in numerous campaigns, especially in the Middle East and North Africa. Casualties were moderate (in terms of the world war), with 24,000 killed; 64,000 wounded; 12,000 missing (probably dead), and 60,000 captured at Singapore in 1942.

London paid most of the cost of the Indian Army, which had the effect of erasing India's national debt; it ended the war with a surplus of £1,300 million. In addition, heavy British spending on munitions produced in India (such as uniforms, rifles, machine-guns, field artillery, and ammunition) led to a rapid expansion of industrial output, such as textiles (up 16%), steel (up 18%), and chemicals (up 30%). Small warships were built, and an aircraft factory opened in Bangalore. The railway system, with 700,000 employees, was taxed to the limit as demand for transportation soared. The British government sent the Cripps mission in 1942 to secure Indian nationalists' co-operation in the war effort in exchange for a promise of independence as soon as the war ended. Top officials in Britain, most notably Prime Minister Winston Churchill, did not support the Cripps Mission and negotiations with the Congress soon broke down.

Congress launched the Quit India Movement in July 1942, demanding the immediate withdrawal of the British from India or face nationwide civil disobedience. On 8 August, the Raj arrested all national, provincial, and local Congress leaders, holding tens of thousands of them until 1945. The country erupted in violent demonstrations led by students and later by peasant political groups, especially in Eastern United Provinces, Bihar, and western Bengal. The large wartime British Army presence crushed the movement in a little more than six weeks; nonetheless, a portion of the movement formed for a time an underground provisional government on the border with Nepal. In other parts of India, the movement was less spontaneous and the protest less intensive; however, it lasted sporadically into the summer of 1943.

Earlier, Subhas Chandra Bose, who had been a leader of the younger, radical wing of the Indian National Congress in the late 1920s and 1930s, had risen to become Congress President from 1938 to 1939. However, he was ousted from the Congress in 1939 following differences with the high command, and subsequently placed under house arrest by the British before escaping from India in early 1941. He turned to Nazi Germany and Imperial Japan for help in gaining India's independence by force. With Japanese support, he organised the Indian National Army, composed largely of Indian soldiers of the British Indian Army who had been captured by the Japanese in the Battle of Singapore. As the war turned against them, the Japanese came to support several puppet and provisional governments in the captured regions, including those in Burma, the Philippines and Vietnam, and in addition, the Provisional Government of Azad Hind, presided by Bose.

Bose's effort, however, was short-lived. In mid-1944, the British Army first halted and then reversed the Japanese U-Go offensive, beginning the successful part of the Burma Campaign. Bose's Indian National Army largely disintegrated during the subsequent fighting in Burma, with its remaining elements surrendering with the recapture of Singapore in September 1945. Bose died in August from third degree burns received after attempting to escape in an overloaded Japanese plane which crashed in Taiwan, which many Indians believe did not happen. Although Bose was unsuccessful, he roused patriotic feelings in India.

Mahatma Gandhi (centre-right) and Rajendra Prasad (centre-left) on their way to meet the viceroy, Lord Linlithgow, on 13 October 1939, after the outbreak of World War II

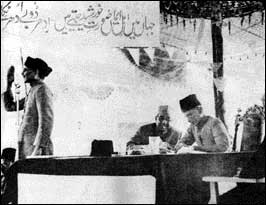
Chaudhari Khaliquzzaman (left) seconding the 1940 Lahore Resolution of the Muslim League with Jinnah (right) presiding, and Liaquat Ali Khan (centre)

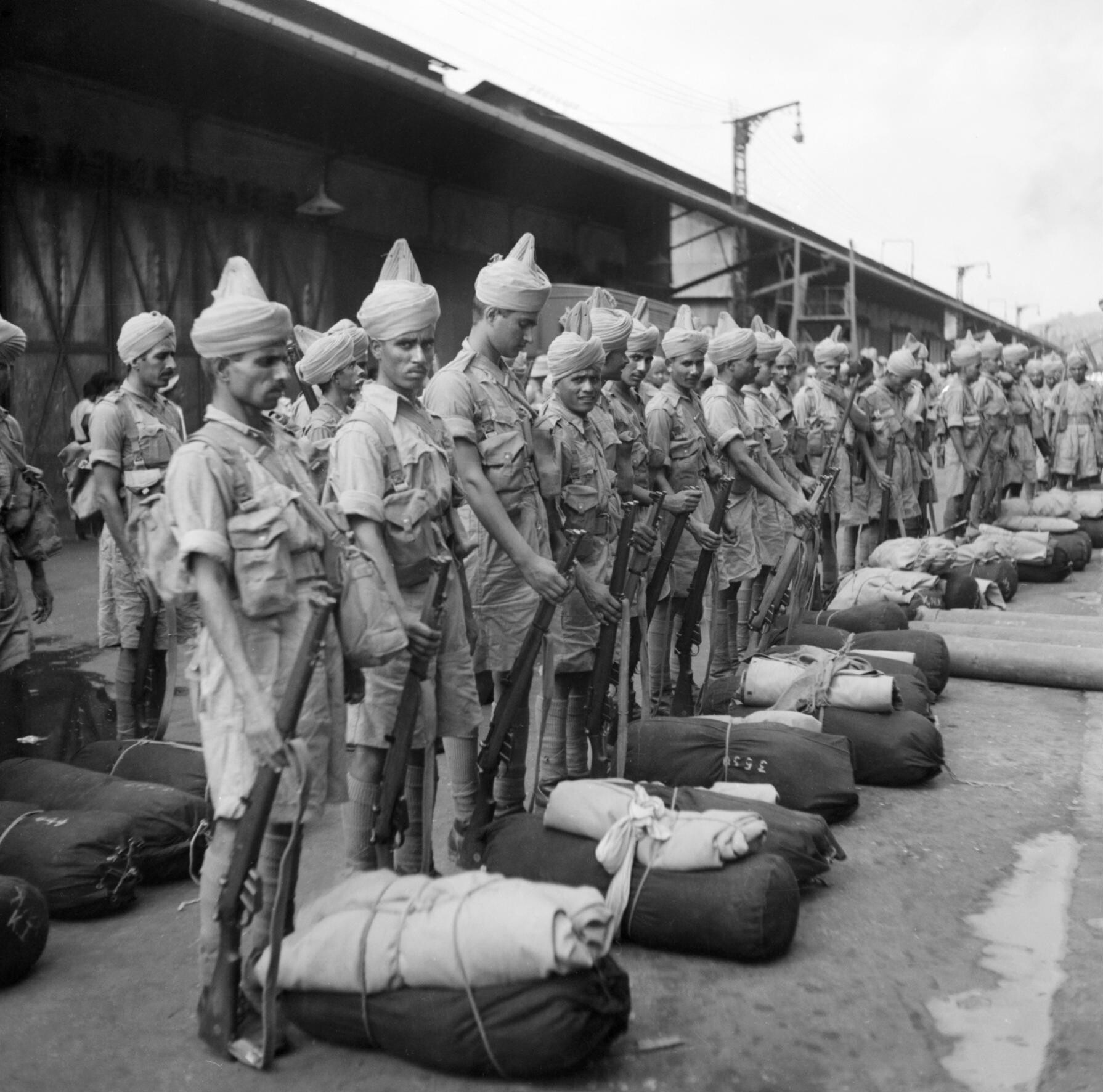
Newly arrived Indian troops on the quayside in Singapore, November 1941

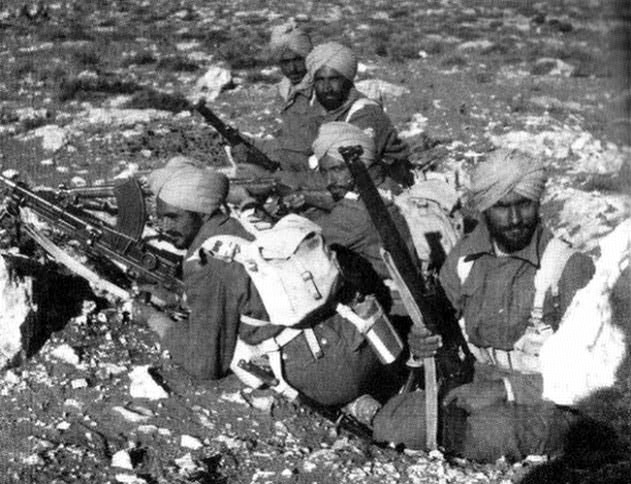
Indian Army troops in action during Operation Crusader in the Western Desert Campaign in North Africa in November/December 1941

=== 1946–1947: Independence and partition ===
In January 1946, several mutinies broke out in the armed services, starting with that of RAF servicemen frustrated with their slow repatriation to Britain. The mutinies came to a head with mutiny of the Royal Indian Navy in Bombay in February 1946, followed by others in Calcutta, Madras, and Karachi. Although the mutinies were rapidly suppressed, they had the effect of spurring the new Labour government in Britain to action, and leading to the Cabinet Mission to India led by the Secretary of State for India, Lord Pethick Lawrence, and including Sir Stafford Cripps, who had visited four years before.

Also in early 1946, new elections were called in India. Earlier, at the end of the war in 1945, the colonial government had announced the public trial of three senior officers of Bose's defeated Indian National Army who stood accused of treason. Now, as the trials began, the Congress leadership, although ambivalent towards the INA, chose to defend the accused officers. The subsequent convictions of the officers, the public outcry against the convictions, and the eventual remission of the sentences created positive propaganda for the Congress, which only helped in the party's subsequent electoral victories in eight of the eleven provinces. The negotiations between the Congress and the Muslim League, however, stumbled over the issue of the partition. Jinnah proclaimed 16 August 1946, Direct Action Day, with the stated goal of highlighting, peacefully, the demand for a Muslim homeland in British India. The following day, Hindu-Muslim riots broke out in Calcutta and quickly spread throughout British India. Although the Government of India and the Congress were both shaken by the course of events, in September, a Congress-led interim government was installed, with Jawaharlal Nehru as united India's prime minister.

Later that year, the British Exchequer exhausted by the recently concluded World War II, and the Labour government conscious that it had neither the mandate at home, the international support, nor the reliability of native forces for continuing to control an increasingly restless British India, decided to end British rule of India, and in early 1947 Britain announced its intention of transferring power no later than June 1948. As independence approached, the violence between Hindus and Muslims in the provinces of Punjab and Bengal continued unabated. With the British army unprepared for the potential for increased violence, the new viceroy, Louis Mountbatten, advanced the date for the transfer of power, allowing less than six months for a mutually agreed plan for independence. With the partition of India, the end of the British rule in India in August 1947 saw the creation of two separate states of India and Pakistan.

On 15 August 1947, the new Dominion of Pakistan (later Islamic Republic of Pakistan), with Muhammad Ali Jinnah as the governor-general; and the Dominion of India, (later Republic of India) with Jawaharlal Nehru as the prime minister, and the viceroy, Louis Mountbatten, staying on as its first governor-general came into being; with official ceremonies took place in Karachi on 14 and New Delhi on 15 August. This was done so that Mountbatten could attend both ceremonies. The great majority of Indians remained in place with independence, but in border areas millions of people (Hindu, Muslim, and Sikh) relocated across the newly drawn borders. In Punjab, where the new border lines divided the Sikh regions in half, there was much bloodshed; in Bengal and Bihar, where Gandhi's presence assuaged communal tempers, the violence was more limited. In all, somewhere between 250,000 and 500,000 people on both sides of the new borders, among both the refugee and resident populations of the three faiths, died in the violence.

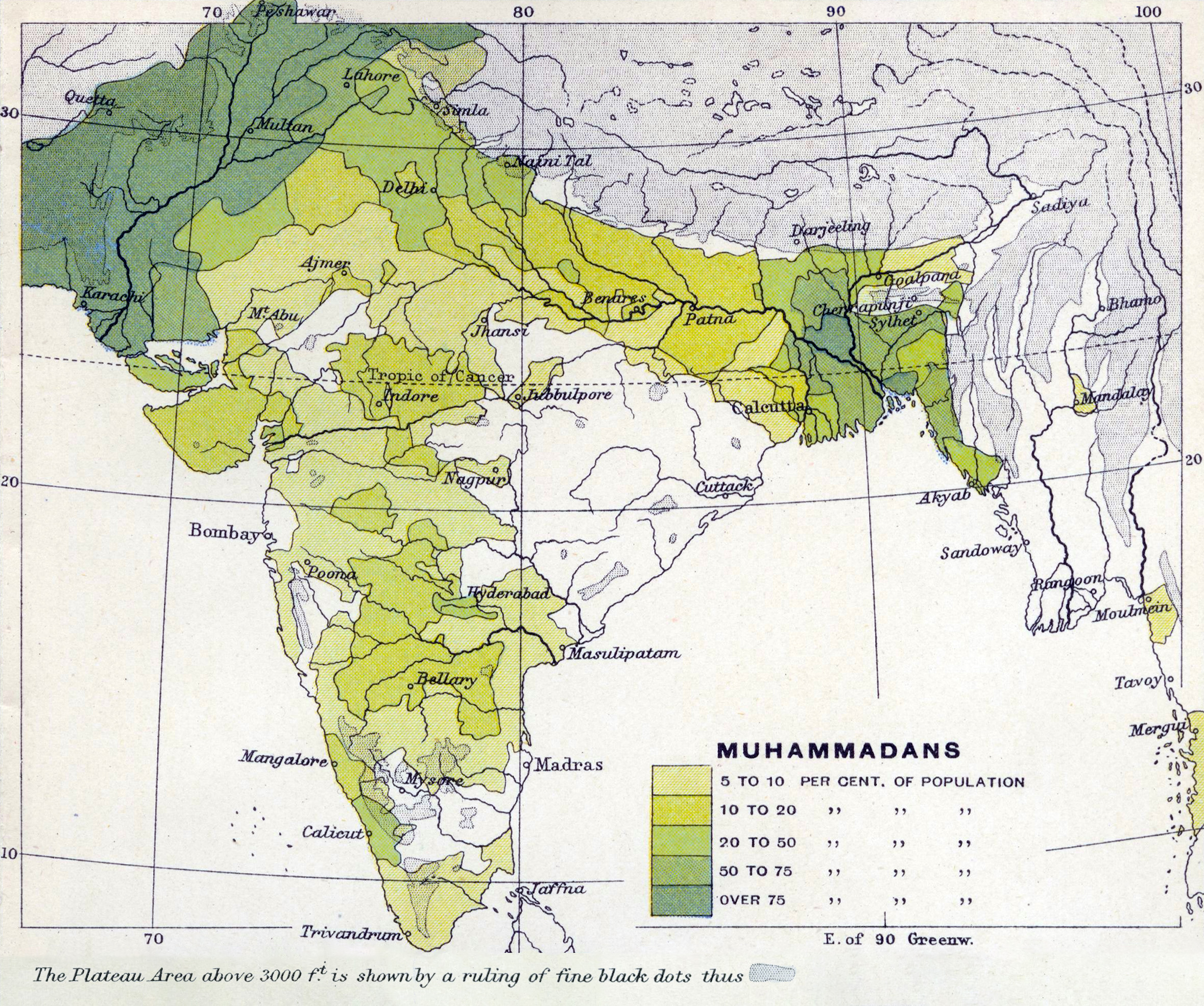
Percentage of Muslims by district, in 1901

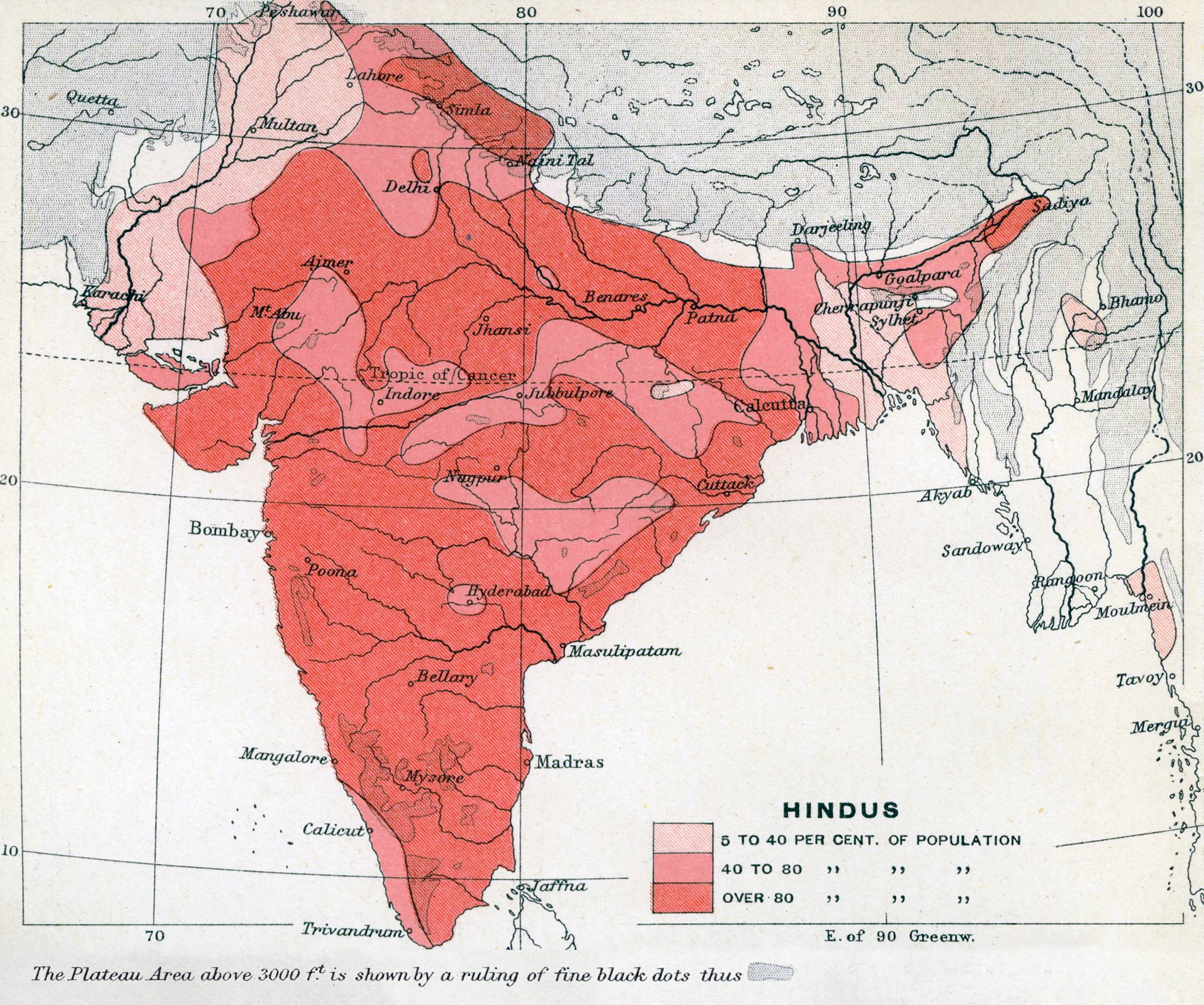
Percentage of Hindus by district, 1901

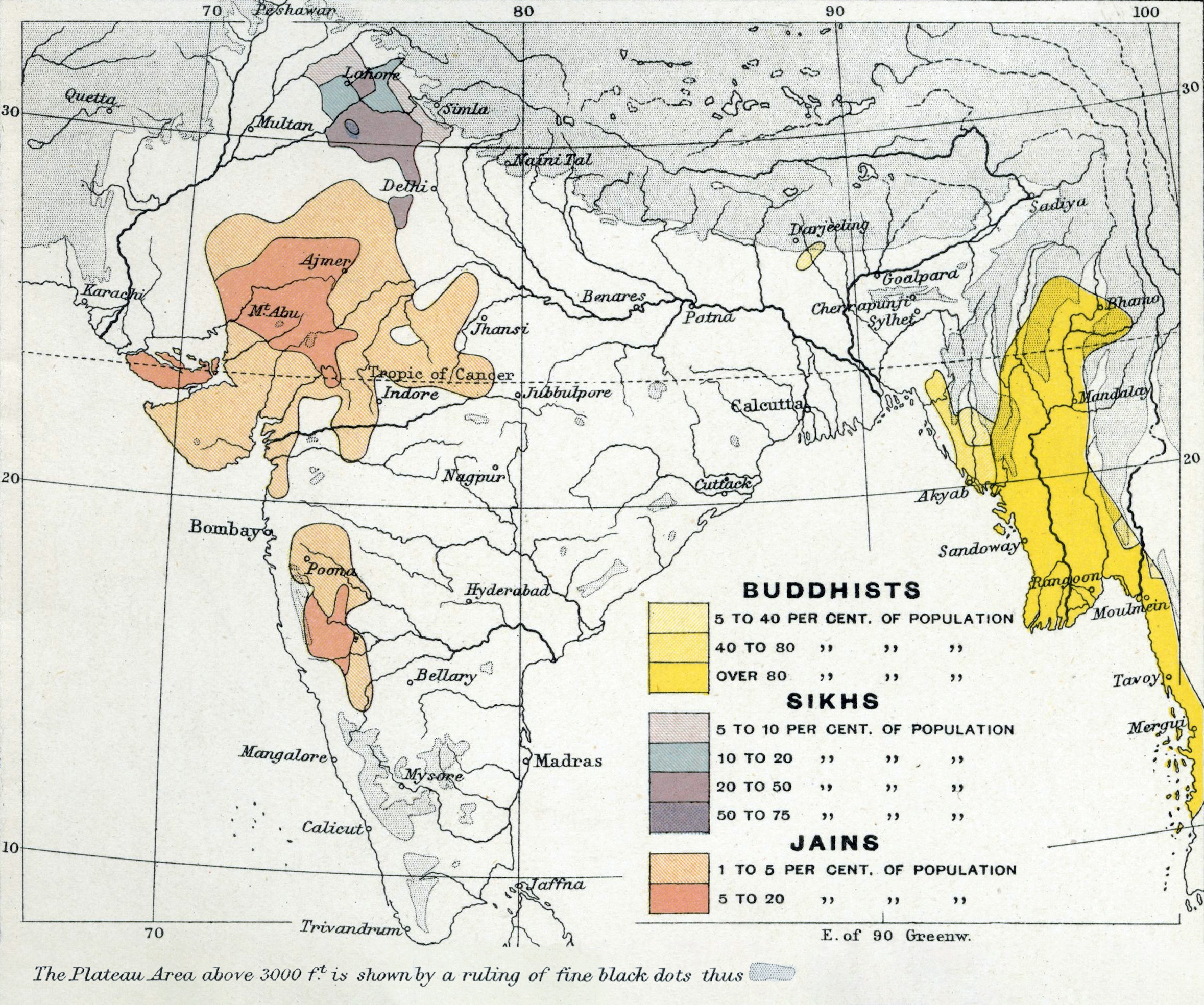
District-wide percentages of Buddhists, Sikhs, and Jains in 1901

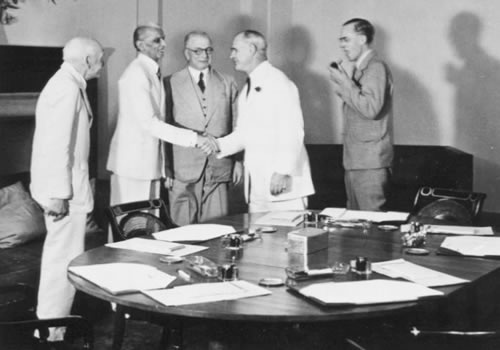
Members of the 1946 Cabinet Mission to India meeting Muhammad Ali Jinnah. Far left is Lord Pethick Lawrence; far right is Sir Stafford Cripps.

=== Timeline of major events, legislation, and public works ===
The reigning British monarchs during the period of the British Raj, 1858–1947, on silver one-rupee coins.

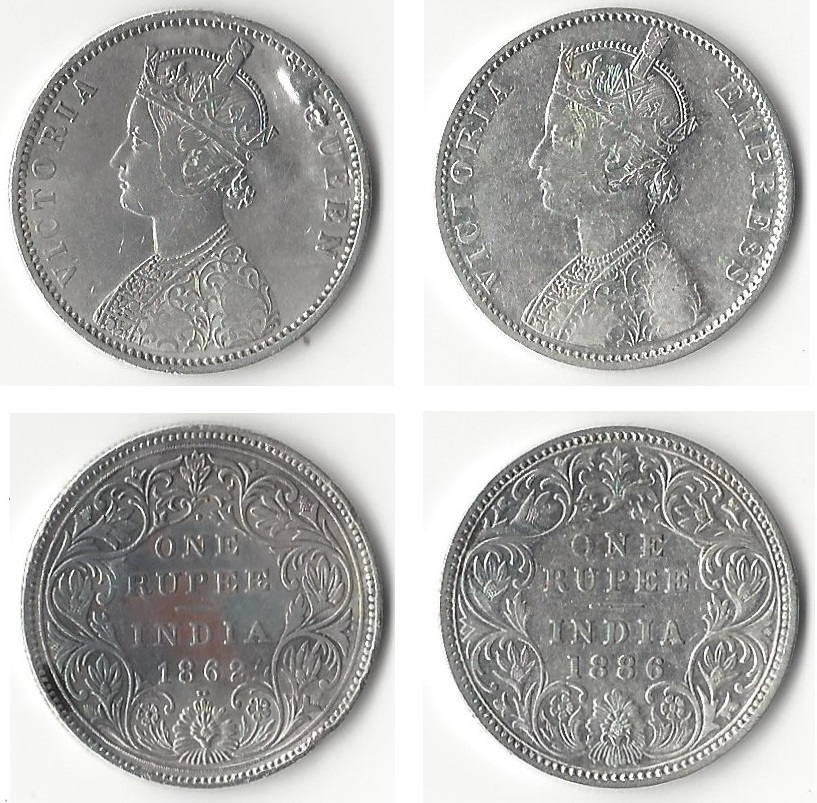
Two silver one-rupee coins used in India during the British Raj, showing Victoria, Queen, 1862 (left) and Victoria, Empress, 1886 (right)

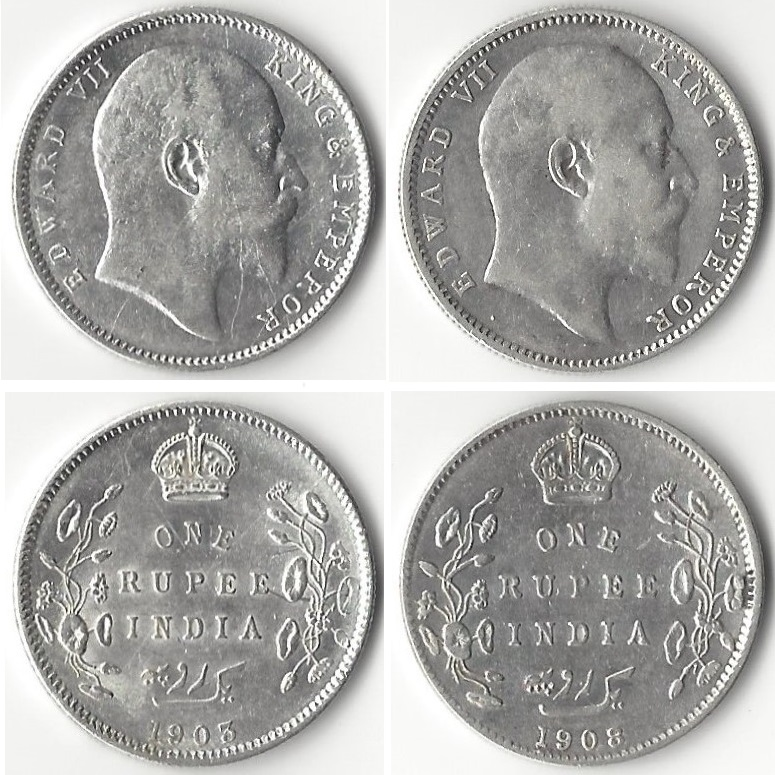
Silver one rupee coins showing Edward VII, King-Emperor, 1903 (left) and 1908 (right)

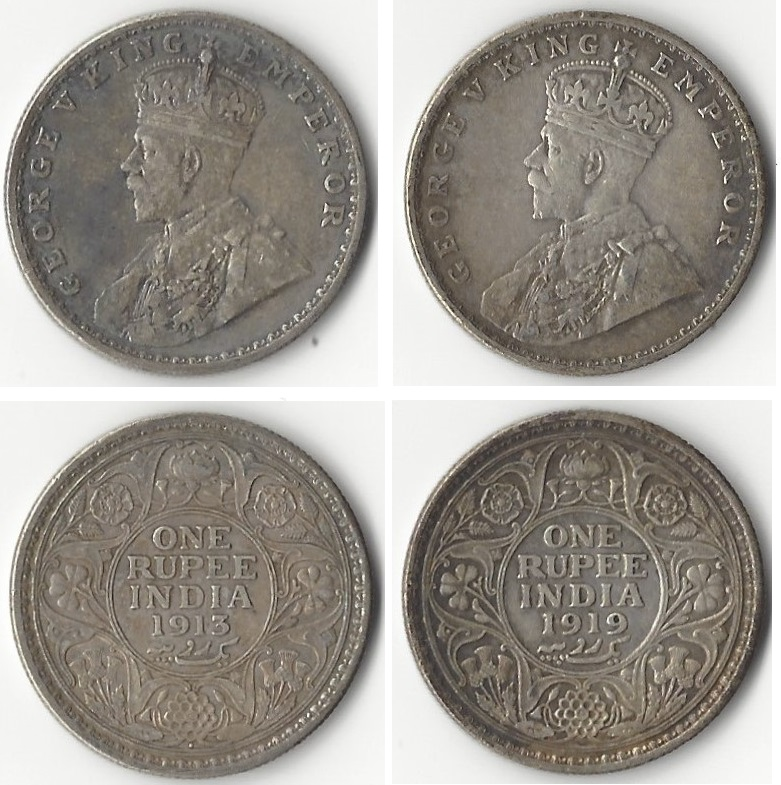
Silver one rupee coins used in India during the British Raj, showing George V, King-Emperor, 1913 (left) and 1919 (right)

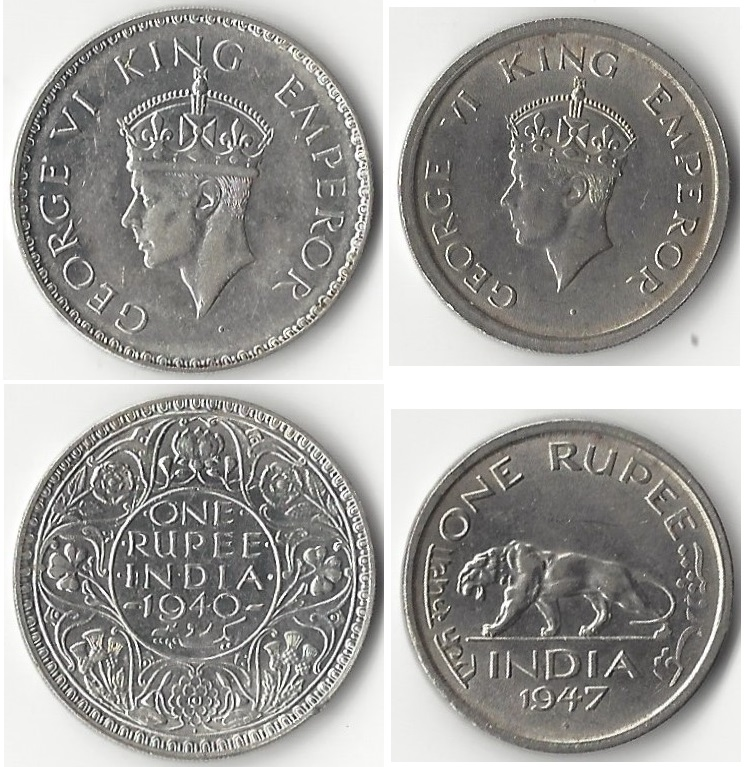
One rupee coins showing George VI, King-Emperor, 1940 (left) and just before India's independence in 1947 (right) (Note: The only other emperor during this period, Edward VIII (reigned January to December 1936), did not issue any Indian currency under his name.)

Period	Presiding Viceroy	Major events, legislation, public works
1 November 1858 – 21 March 1862	Viscount Canning	1858 reorganisation of British Indian Army (contemporaneously and hereafter Indian Army); Construction begins (1860): University of Bombay, University of Madras, and University of Calcutta; Indian Penal Code passed into law in 1860. Upper Doab famine of 1860–1861; Indian Councils Act 1861; Establishment of Archaeological Survey of India in 1861; James Wilson, financial member of Council of India, reorganises customs, imposes income tax, creates paper currency. Indian Police Act 1861: creation of the Imperial Police, later known as the Indian Police Service.
21 March 1862 – 20 November 1863	Earl of Elgin	Viceroy dies prematurely in Dharamsala in 1863
12 January 1864 – 12 January 1869	Sir John Lawrence, Bt	Anglo-Bhutan Duar War (1864–1865); Orissa famine of 1866; Rajputana famine of 1869; Creation of Department of Irrigation. Creation of the Imperial Forestry Service in 1867 (now the Indian Forest Service). "Nicobar Islands annexed and incorporated into India 1869"
12 January 1869 – 8 February 1872	Earl of Mayo	Creation of Department of Agriculture (now Ministry of Agriculture); Major extension of railways, roads, and canals Indian Councils Act 1870; Creation of Andaman and Nicobar Islands as a Chief Commissionership (1872). Assassination of Lord Mayo in the Andamans.
3 May 1872 – 12 April 1876	Lord Northbrook	Deaths in Bihar famine of 1873–1874 prevented by import of rice from Burma. Gaikwad of Baroda dethroned for misgovernment; dominions passed to a child prince. Indian Councils Act 1874; Visit of the Prince of Wales, the future Edward VII, in 1875–76.
12 April 1876 – 8 June 1880	Lord Lytton	Baluchistan established as a Chief Commissionership; Queen Victoria (in absentia) proclaimed Empress of India at Delhi Durbar of 1877. Great Famine of 1876–1878: 5.25 million dead; reduced relief offered at expense of Rs. 80 million. Creation of Famine Commission of 1878–80 under Sir Richard Strachey. Indian Forest Act of 1878; Second Anglo-Afghan War.
8 June 1880 – 13 December 1884	Marquess of Ripon	End of Second Anglo-Afghan War. Repeal of the Vernacular Press Act of 1878. Compromise on the Ilbert Bill. Local Government Acts extend self-government from towns to the country. University of Punjab established in Lahore in 1882; Famine Code promulgated in 1883 by the Government of India. Creation of the Education Commission. Creation of indigenous schools, especially for Muslims. Repeal of import duties on cotton and of most tariffs. Railway extension.
13 December 1884 – 10 December 1888	Earl of Dufferin	Passage of Bengal Tenancy Bill; Third Anglo-Burmese War. Joint Anglo-Russian Boundary Commission appointed for the Afghan frontier. Russian attack on Afghans at Panjdeh (1885). The Great Game in full play. Report of Public Services Commission of 1886–87, creation of the Imperial Civil Service (later the Indian Civil Service (ICS), and today the Indian Administrative Service); University of Allahabad established in 1887; Queen Victoria's Jubilee, 1887.
10 December 1888 – 11 October 1894	Marquess of Lansdowne	Strengthening of NW Frontier defence. Creation of Imperial Service Troops consisting of regiments contributed by the princely states. Gilgit Agency leased in 1899; British Parliament passes Indian Councils Act 1892, opening the Imperial Legislative Council to Indians. Revolution in princely state of Manipur and subsequent reinstatement of ruler. High point of The Great Game. Establishment of the Durand Line between British India and Afghanistan. Railways, roads, and irrigation works begun in Burma. Border between Burma and Siam finalised in 1893. Fall of the rupee, resulting from the steady depreciation of silver currency worldwide (1873–93). Indian Prisons Act of 1894
11 October 1894 – 6 January 1899	Earl of Elgin	Reorganisation of Indian Army (from Presidency System to the four Commands). Pamir agreement Russia, 1895; The Chitral Campaign (1895), the Tirah campaign (1896–97); Indian famine of 1896–1897 beginning in Bundelkhand. Bubonic plague in Bombay (1896), Bubonic plague in Calcutta (1898); riots in the wake of plague prevention measures. Establishment of Provincial Legislative Councils in Burma and Punjab; the former a new Lieutenant Governorship.
6 January 1899 – 18 November 1905	Lord Curzon of Kedleston	Creation of the North-West Frontier Province under a Chief Commissioner (1901). Indian famine of 1899–1900. Return of the bubonic plague, 1 million deaths Financial Reform Act of 1899; Gold Reserve Fund created for India. Punjab Land Alienation Act; Inauguration of Department (now Ministry) of Commerce and Industry. Death of Queen Victoria (1901); dedication of the Victoria Memorial Hall, Calcutta as a national gallery of Indian antiquities, art, and history. Coronation Durbar in Delhi (1903); Edward VII (in absentia) proclaimed Emperor of India. Francis Younghusband's British expedition to Tibet (1903–04); North-Western Provinces (previously Ceded and Conquered Provinces) and Oudh renamed United Provinces in 1904; Reorganisation of Indian Universities Act (1904). Systemisation of preservation and restoration of ancient monuments by Archaeological Survey of India with the Indian Ancient Monument Preservation Act. Inauguration of agricultural banking with Cooperative Credit Societies Act of 1904; Partition of Bengal; new province of East Bengal and Assam under a Lieutenant-Governor. Census of 1901 gives the total population at 294 million, including 62 million in the princely states and 232 million in British India. About 170,000 are Europeans. 15 million men and 1 million women are literate. Of those school-aged, 25% of the boys and 3% of the girls attend school. There are 207 million Hindus, and 63 million Muslims, along with 9 million Buddhists (in Burma), 3 million Christians, 2 million Sikhs, 1 million Jains, and 8.4 million who practise animism.
18 November 1905 – 23 November 1910	Earl of Minto	Creation of the Railway Board; Anglo-Russian Convention of 1907; Indian Councils Act 1909 (also Minto–Morley Reforms); Appointment of Indian Factories Commission in 1909. Establishment of Department of Education in 1910 (now Ministry of Education)
23 November 1910 – 4 April 1916	Lord Hardinge of Penshurst	Visit of King George V and Queen Mary in 1911: commemoration as Emperor and Empress of India at last Delhi Durbar; King George V announces creation of new city of New Delhi to replace Calcutta as capital of India. Indian High Courts Act 1911; Indian Factories Act of 1911; Construction of New Delhi, 1912–1929; World War I, Indian Army in: Western Front, Belgium, 1914; German East Africa (Battle of Tanga, 1914); Mesopotamian campaign (Battle of Ctesiphon, 1915; Siege of Kut, 1915–16); Battle of Galliopoli, 1915–16; Passage of Defence of India Act 1915
4 April 1916 – 2 April 1921	Lord Chelmsford	Indian Army in: Mesopotamian campaign (Fall of Baghdad, 1917); Sinai and Palestine campaign (Battle of Megiddo, 1918); Passage of Rowlatt Act, 1919; Government of India Act 1919 (also Montagu–Chelmsford Reforms); Jallianwala Bagh massacre, 1919; Third Anglo-Afghan War, 1919; University of Rangoon established in 1920. Indian Passport Act of 1920: British Indian passport introduced
2 April 1921 – 3 April 1926	Earl of Reading	University of Delhi established in 1922. Indian Workers Compensation Act of 1923
3 April 1926 – 18 April 1931	Lord Irwin	Indian Trade Unions Act of 1926, Indian Forest Act, 1927; Appointment of Royal Commission of Indian Labour, 1929; Indian Constitutional Round Table Conferences, London, 1930–32, Gandhi–Irwin Pact, 1931.
18 April 1931 – 18 April 1936	Earl of Willingdon	New Delhi inaugurated as capital of India, 1931. Indian Workmen's Compensation Act of 1933; Indian Factories Act of 1934; Royal Indian Air Force created in 1932. Indian Military Academy established in 1932. Government of India Act 1935; Creation of Reserve Bank of India
18 April 1936 – 1 October 1943	Marquess of Linlithgow	Indian Payment of Wages Act of 1936; Burma administered independently after 1937 with creation of new cabinet position Secretary of State for India and Burma, and with the Burma Office separated off from the India Office; Indian Provincial Elections of 1937; Cripps' mission to India, 1942. Indian Army in Mediterranean, Middle East and African theatres of World War II (North African campaign): (Operation Compass, Operation Crusader, First Battle of El Alamein, Second Battle of El Alamein. East African campaign, 1940, Anglo-Iraqi War, 1941, Syria–Lebanon campaign, 1941, Anglo-Soviet invasion of Iran, 1941); Indian Army in Battle of Hong Kong, Battle of Malaya, Battle of Singapore; Burma campaign of World War II begins in 1942.
1 October 1943 – 21 February 1947	Viscount Wavell	Indian Army becomes, at 2.5 million men, the largest all-volunteer force in history. World War II: Burma Campaign, 1943–45 (Battle of Kohima, Battle of Imphal); Bengal famine of 1943; Indian Army in Italian campaign (Battle of Monte Cassino); British Labour Party wins UK General Election of 1945 with Clement Attlee becoming prime minister. 1946 Cabinet Mission to India; Indian Elections of 1946.
21 February 1947 – 15 August 1947	Viscount Mountbatten of Burma	Indian Independence Act 1947 of the British Parliament enacted on 18 July 1947. Radcliffe Award, August 1947; Partition of India, August 1947; India Office and position of Secretary of State for India abolished; ministerial responsibility within the United Kingdom for British relations with India and Pakistan transferred to the Commonwealth Relations Office.

== British India and the princely states ==
India during the British Raj was made up of two types of territory: British India and the Native States (or princely states). In its Interpretation Act 1889, the British Parliament adopted the following definitions in Section 18:

(4.) The expression "British India" shall mean all territories and places within Her Majesty's dominions which are for the time being governed by Her Majesty through the Governor-General of India or through any governor or other officer subordinate to the Governor-General of India.

(5.) The expression "India" shall mean British India together with any territories of any native prince or chief under the suzerainty of Her Majesty exercised through the Governor-General of India, or through any governor or other officer subordinate to the Governor-General of India.

In general, the term "British India" has been used (and is still used) to refer also to the regions under the rule of the British East India Company in India from 1600 to 1858. The term has also been used to refer to the "British in India". The terms "Indian Empire" and "Empire of India" (like the term "British Empire") were not used in legislation. The monarch was officially known as Empress or Emperor of India, and the term was often used in Queen Victoria's Queen's Speeches and Prorogation Speeches. In addition, an order of knighthood, the Most Eminent Order of the Indian Empire, was set up in 1878. Suzerainty over 175 princely states, some of the largest and most important, was exercised (in the name of the British Crown) by the central government of British India under the viceroy; the remaining approximately 500 states were dependents of the provincial governments of British India under a governor, lieutenant-governor, or chief commissioner (as the case might have been). A clear distinction between "dominion" and "suzerainty" was supplied by the jurisdiction of the courts of law: the law of British India rested upon the laws passed by the British Parliament and the legislative powers those laws vested in the various governments of British India, both central and local; in contrast, the courts of the Princely States existed under the authority of the respective rulers of those states.

=== Major provinces ===
At the turn of the 20th century, British India consisted of eight provinces that were administered either by a governor or a lieutenant-governor.

Areas and populations (excluding the dependent Native States) c. 1907
Province of British India (and present-day territories)	Total area	Population in 1901 (millions)	Chief administrative officer
Assam (Assam, Arunachal Pradesh, Meghalaya, Mizoram, Nagaland)	130,000 km^{2} (50,000 sq mi)	6	Chief Commissioner
Bengal (Bangladesh, West Bengal, Bihar, Jharkhand and Odisha)	390,000 km^{2} (150,000 sq mi)	75	Lieutenant-Governor
Bombay (Sindh and parts of Maharashtra, Gujarat and Karnataka)	320,000 km^{2} (120,000 sq mi)	19	Governor-in-Council
Burma (Myanmar)	440,000 km^{2} (170,000 sq mi)	9	Lieutenant-Governor
Central Provinces and Berar (Madhya Pradesh and parts of Maharashtra, Chhattisgarh and Odisha)	270,000 km^{2} (100,000 sq mi)	13	Chief Commissioner
Madras (Andhra Pradesh, Tamil Nadu and parts of Kerala, Karnataka, Odisha and Telangana)	370,000 km^{2} (140,000 sq mi)	38	Governor-in-Council
Punjab (Punjab Province, Islamabad Capital Territory, Punjab, Haryana, Himachal Pradesh, Chandigarh and the National Capital Territory of Delhi)	250,000 km^{2} (97,000 sq mi)	20	Lieutenant-Governor
United Provinces (Uttar Pradesh and Uttarakhand)	280,000 km^{2} (110,000 sq mi)	48	Lieutenant-Governor

During the partition of Bengal (1905–1913), the new province of Eastern Bengal and Assam was created as a Lieutenant-Governorship. In 1911, East Bengal was reunited with Bengal, and the new provinces in the east became: Assam, Bengal, Bihar and Orissa.

=== Minor provinces ===
In addition, there were a few minor provinces that were administered by a chief commissioner:

Minor province of British India (and present day territories)	Total area in km^{2} (sq mi)	Population in 1901 (in thousands)	Chief administrative officer
Ajmer-Merwara (parts of Rajasthan)	7,000 (2,700)	477	ex officio Chief Commissioner
Andaman and Nicobar Islands (Andaman and Nicobar Islands)	78,000 (30,000)	25	Chief Commissioner
British Baluchistan (Balochistan)	120,000 (46,000)	308	ex officio Chief Commissioner
Coorg Province (Kodagu district)	4,100 (1,600)	181	ex officio Chief Commissioner
North West Frontier Province (Khyber Pakhtunkhwa)	41,000 (16,000)	2,125	Chief Commissioner

=== Princely states ===
A princely State, also called a Native State or an Indian State, was a British vassal state in India with an indigenous nominal Indian ruler, subject to a subsidiary alliance. There were 565 princely states when India and Pakistan became independent from Britain in August 1947. The princely states did not form a part of British India (i.e. the presidencies and provinces), as they were not directly under British rule. The larger ones had treaties with Britain that specified which rights the princes had; in the smaller ones, the princes had few rights. Within the princely states, external affairs, defence, and most communications were under British control. The British also exercised a general influence over the states' internal politics, in part through the granting or withholding of recognition of individual rulers. Although there were nearly 600 princely states, the great majority were very small and contracted out the business of government to the British. Some two hundred of the states had an area of less than 25 square kilometres (10 square miles). The last vestige of the Mughal Empire in Delhi which was under Company authority before the advent of British Raj was finally abolished and seized by the Crown in the aftermath of the Sepoy Mutiny of 1857 for its support to the rebellion. The princely states were grouped into agencies and residencies.

=== Organisation ===
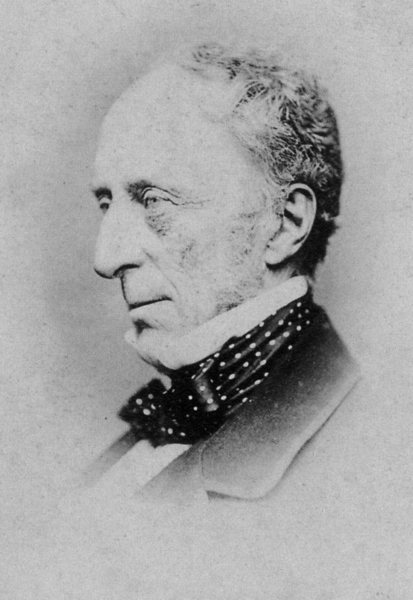
Sir Charles Wood (1800–1885) was President of the Board of Control of the East India Company from 1852 to 1855; he shaped British education policy in India, and was Secretary of State for India from 1859 to 1866.

Following the Indian Rebellion of 1857 (usually called the Indian Mutiny by the British), the Government of India Act 1858 made changes in the governance of India at three levels:

1. in the imperial government in London,
2. in the central government in Calcutta, and
3. in the provincial governments in the presidencies (and later in the provinces).

In London, it provided for a cabinet-level Secretary of State for India and a fifteen-member Council of India, whose members were required, as one prerequisite of membership, to have spent at least ten years in India and to have done so no more than ten years before. Although the Secretary of State formulated the policy instructions to be communicated to India, he was required in most instances to consult the Council, but especially so in matters relating to the spending of Indian revenues. The Act envisaged a system of "double government" in which the Council ideally served both as a check on excesses in imperial policy-making and as a body of up-to-date expertise on India. However, the Secretary of State also had special emergency powers that allowed him to make unilateral decisions, and, in reality, the Council's expertise was sometimes outdated. From 1858 until 1947, twenty-seven individuals served as Secretary of State for India and directed the India Office; these included: Sir Charles Wood (1859–1866), the Marquess of Salisbury (1874–1878; later British prime minister), John Morley (1905–1910; initiator of the Minto–Morley Reforms), E. S. Montagu (1917–1922; an architect of the Montagu–Chelmsford Reforms), and Frederick Pethick-Lawrence (1945–1947; head of the 1946 Cabinet Mission to India). The size of the Advisory Council was reduced over the next half-century, but its powers remained unchanged. In 1907, for the first time, two Indians were appointed to the Council. They were K.G. Gupta and Syed Hussain Bilgrami.

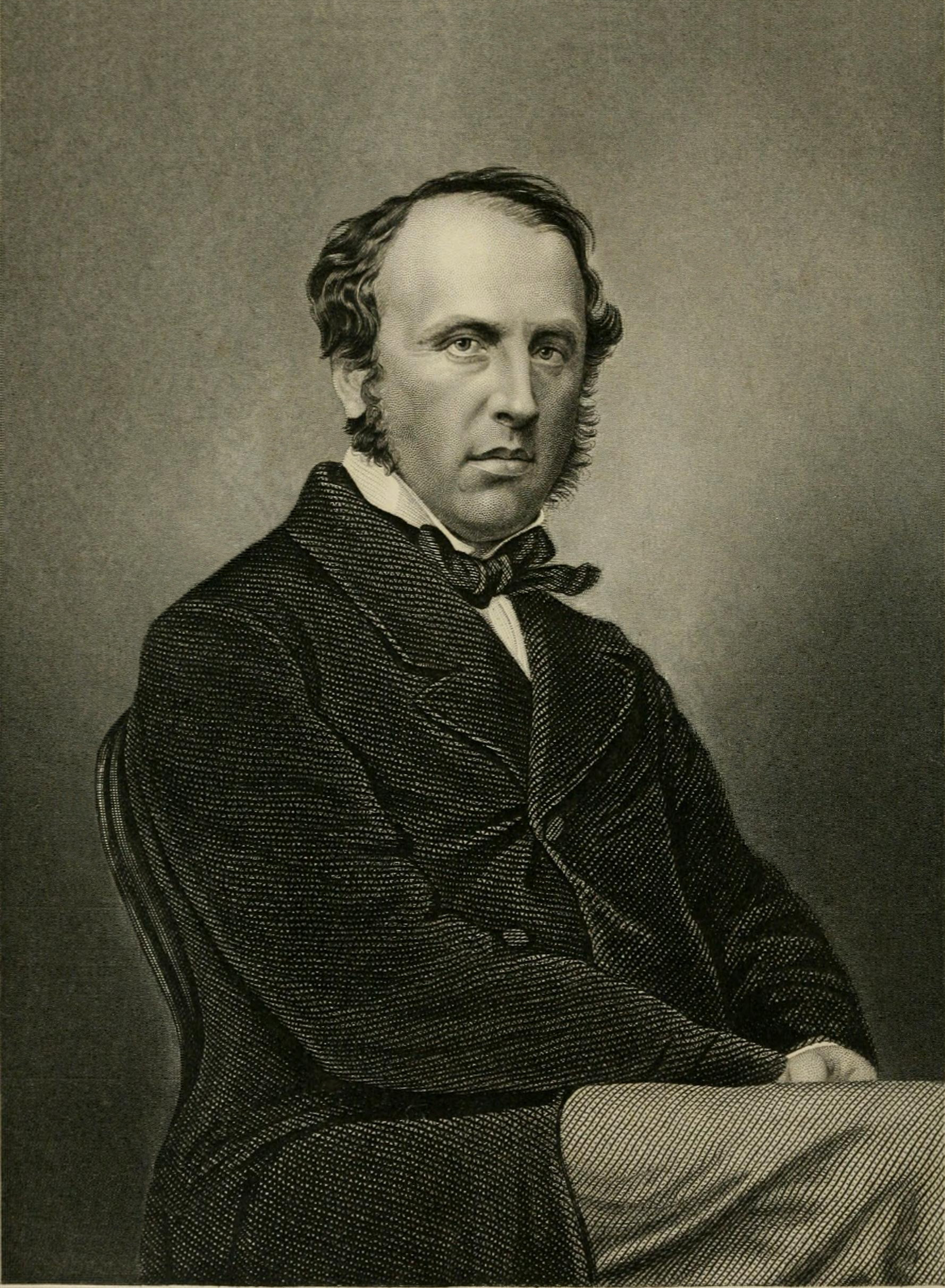
Lord Canning, the last Governor-General of India under Company rule and the first viceroy of India under Crown rule

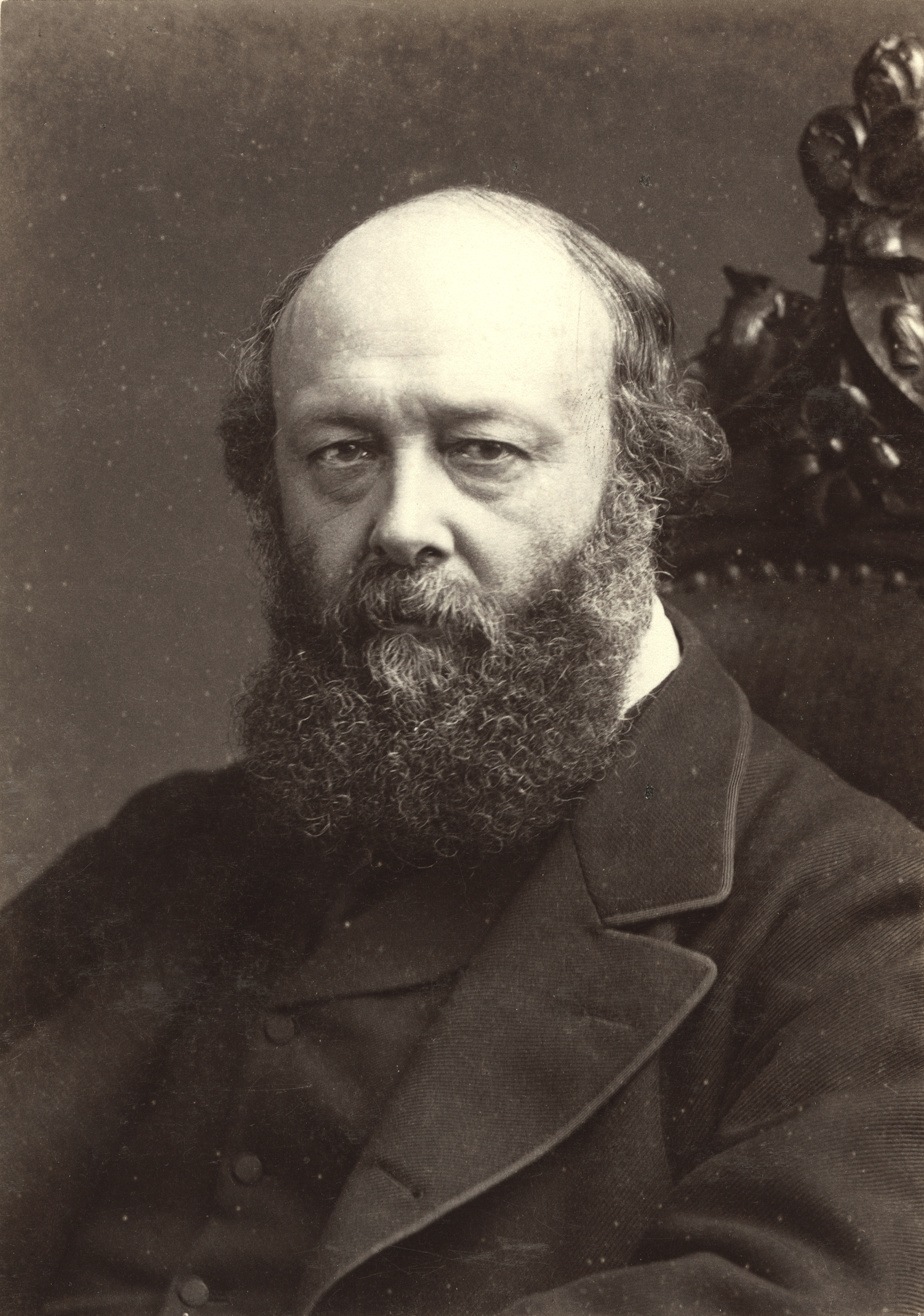
Lord Salisbury was Secretary of State for India from 1874 to 1878

In Calcutta, the governor-general remained head of the Government of India and now was more commonly called the viceroy on account of his secondary role as the Crown's representative to the nominally sovereign princely states; he was, however, now responsible to the Secretary of State in London and through him to Parliament. A system of "double government" had already been in place during the Company's rule in India from the time of Pitt's India Act of 1784. The governor-general in the capital, Calcutta, and the governor in a subordinate presidency (Madras or Bombay) were each required to consult his advisory council; executive orders in Calcutta, for example, were issued in the name of "Governor-General-in-Council" (i.e. the Governor-General with the advice of the Council). The Company's system of "double government" had its critics, since, from the time of the system's inception, there had been intermittent feuding between the governor-general and his Council; still, the Act of 1858 made no major changes in governance. However, in the years immediately thereafter, which were also the years of post-rebellion reconstruction, Viceroy Lord Canning found the collective decision making of the Council to be too time-consuming for the pressing tasks ahead, so he requested the "portfolio system" of an Executive Council in which the business of each government department (the "portfolio") was assigned to and became the responsibility of a single council member. Routine departmental decisions were made exclusively by the member, but important decisions required the consent of the governor-general and, in the absence of such consent, required discussion by the entire Executive Council. This innovation in Indian governance was promulgated in the Indian Councils Act 1861.

If the Government of India needed to enact new laws, the Councils Act allowed for a Legislative Council—an expansion of the Executive Council by up to twelve additional members, each appointed to a two-year term—with half the members consisting of British officials of the government (termed official) and allowed to vote, and the other half, comprising Indians and domiciled Britons in India (termed non-official) and serving only in an advisory capacity. All laws enacted by Legislative Councils in India, whether by the Imperial Legislative Council in Calcutta or by the provincial ones in Madras and Bombay, required the final assent of the secretary of state in London; this prompted Sir Charles Wood, the second secretary of state, to describe the Government of India as "a despotism controlled from home". Moreover, although the appointment of Indians to the Legislative Council was a response to calls after the 1857 rebellion, most notably by Sayyid Ahmad Khan, for more consultation with Indians, the Indians so appointed were from the landed aristocracy, often chosen for their loyalty, and far from representative. Even so, the "... tiny advances in the practice of representative government were intended to provide safety valves for the expression of public opinion, which had been so badly misjudged before the rebellion". Indian affairs now also came to be more closely examined in the British Parliament and more widely discussed in the British press.

With the promulgation of the Government of India Act 1935, the Council of India was abolished with effect from 1 April 1937, and a modified system of government was enacted. The Secretary of State for India represented the Government of India in the UK. He was assisted by a body of advisers numbering from 8–12 individuals, at least half of whom were required to have held office in India for a minimum of 10 years, and had not relinquished office earlier than two years before they were appointed advisers to the Secretary of State. The viceroy and governor-general of India, a Crown appointee, typically held office for five years though there was no fixed tenure, and received an annual salary of Rs. 250,800 p.a. (£18,810 p.a.). He headed the Viceroy's Executive Council, each member of which had responsibility for a department of the central administration. From 1 April 1937, the position of Governor-General in Council, which the viceroy and governor-general concurrently held in the capacity of representing the Crown in relations with the Indian princely states, was replaced by the designation of "HM Representative for the Exercise of the Functions of the Crown in its Relations with the Indian States", or the "Crown Representative". The Executive Council was greatly expanded during the Second World War, and in 1947 comprised 14 members (secretaries), each of whom earned a salary of Rs. 66,000 p.a. (£4,950 p.a.).

Until 1946, the viceroy held the portfolio for External Affairs and Commonwealth Relations, as well as heading the Political Department in his capacity as the Crown representative. Each department was headed by a secretary excepting the Railway Department, which was headed by a Chief Commissioner of Railways under a secretary. The viceroy and governor-general was also the head of the bicameral Indian Legislature, consisting of an upper house (the Council of State) and a lower house (the Legislative Assembly). The viceroy was the head of the Council of State, while the Legislative Assembly, which was first opened in 1921, was headed by an elected president (appointed by the Viceroy from 1921 to 1925). The Council of State consisted of 58 members (32 elected, 26 nominated), while the Legislative Assembly comprised 141 members (26 nominated officials, 13 others nominated and 102 elected). The Council of State existed in five-year periods and the Legislative Assembly for three-year periods, though either could be dissolved earlier or later by the Viceroy. The Indian Legislature was empowered to make laws for all persons resident in British India including all British subjects resident in India, and for all British Indian subjects residing outside India. With the assent of the King-Emperor and after copies of a proposed enactment had been submitted to both houses of the British Parliament, the Viceroy could overrule the legislature and directly enact any measures in the perceived interests of British India or its residents if the need arose.

Effective from 1 April 1936, the Government of India Act created the new provinces of Sind (separated from the Bombay Presidency) and Orissa (separated from the Province of Bihar and Orissa). Burma and Aden became separate Crown Colonies under the Act from 1 April 1937, thereby ceasing to be part of the Indian Empire. From 1937 onwards, British India was divided into 17 administrations: the three Presidencies of Madras, Bombay and Bengal, and the 14 provinces of the United Provinces, Punjab, Bihar, the Central Provinces and Berar, Assam, the North-West Frontier Province (NWFP), Orissa, Sind, British Baluchistan, Delhi, Ajmer-Merwara, Coorg, the Andaman and Nicobar Islands and Panth Piploda. The Presidencies and the first eight provinces were each under a governor, while the latter six provinces were each under a chief commissioner. The viceroy directly governed the chief commissioner provinces through each respective chief commissioner, while the Presidencies and the provinces under governors were allowed greater autonomy under the Government of India Act. Each Presidency or province headed by a governor had either a provincial bicameral legislature (in the Presidencies, the United Provinces, Bihar and Assam) or a unicameral legislature (in the Punjab, Central Provinces and Berar, NWFP, Orissa and Sind). The governor of each presidency or province represented the Crown in his capacity, and was assisted by ministers appointed from the members of each provincial legislature. Each provincial legislature had a life of five years, barring any special circumstances such as wartime conditions. All bills passed by the provincial legislature were either signed or rejected by the governor, who could also issue proclamations or promulgate ordinances while the legislature was in recess, as the need arose. Each province or presidency comprised several divisions, each headed by a commissioner and subdivided into districts, which were the basic administrative units and each headed by a district magistrate, collector or deputy commissioner; in 1947, British India comprised 230 districts.

== Economy ==
=== Economic trends ===
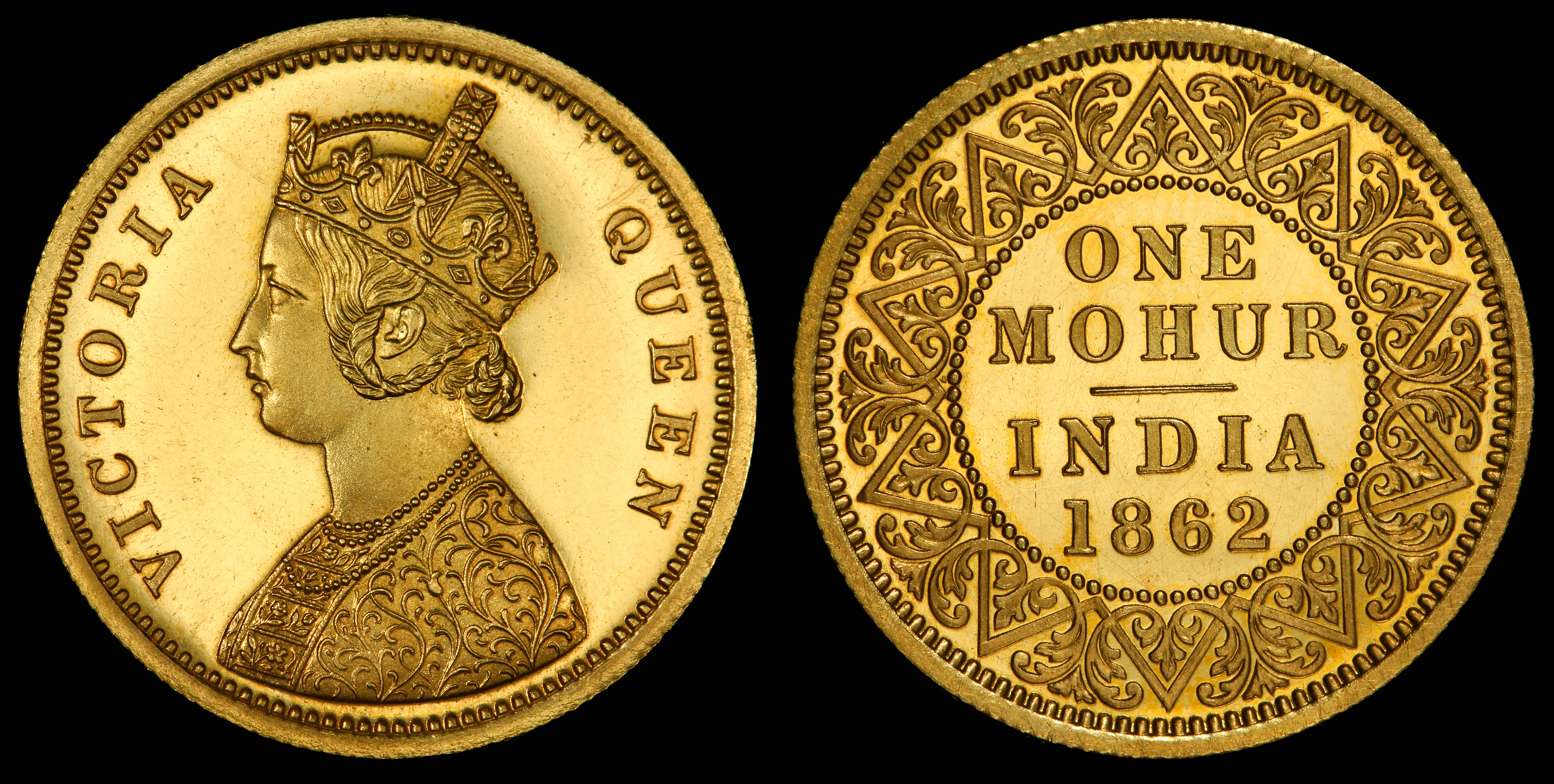
One Mohur depicting Queen Victoria (1862)

All three sectors of the economy—agriculture, manufacturing, and services—accelerated in postcolonial India. In agriculture, a huge increase in production took place in the 1870s. The most important difference between colonial and postcolonial India was the use of land surplus with productivity-led growth by using high-yielding variety seeds, chemical fertilizers, and more intensive application of water. All these three inputs were subsidised by the state. The result was, on average, no long-term change in per capita income levels, though the cost of living had grown higher. Agriculture was still dominant, with most peasants at the subsistence level.

Extensive irrigation systems were built, providing an impetus for switching to cash crops for export and for raw materials for Indian industry, especially jute, cotton, sugarcane, coffee and tea. India's global share of GDP fell drastically from above 20% to less than 5% in the colonial period. Historians have been bitterly divided on issues of economic history, with the Nationalist school (following Nehru) arguing that India was poorer at the end of British rule than at the beginning and that impoverishment occurred because of the British. Mike Davis writes that much of the economic activity in British India was for the benefit of the British economy and was carried out relentlessly through repressive British imperial policies and with negative repercussions for the Indian population. This is reified in India's large exports of wheat to Britain: despite a major famine that claimed between 6 and 10 million lives in the late 1870s, these exports remained unchecked. A colonial government committed to laissez-faire economics refused to interfere with these exports or provide any relief.

==== Industry ====
With the end of the state-granted monopoly of the East India Trading Company in 1813, the importation into India of British manufactured goods, including finished textiles, increased dramatically, from approximately 1 million yards of cotton cloth in 1814 to 13 million in 1820, 995 million in 1870, to 2050 million by 1890. The British imposed "free trade" on India, while continental Europe and the United States erected stiff tariff barriers ranging from 30% to 70% on the importation of cotton yarn or prohibited it entirely. As a result of the less expensive imports from more industrialized Britain, India's most significant industrial sector, textile production, shrank, such that by 1870–1880 Indian producers were manufacturing only 25%–45% of local consumption. Deindustrialization of India's iron industry was even more extensive during this period.

Jamsetji Tata (1839–1904) began his industrial career in 1877 with the Central India Spinning, Weaving, and Manufacturing Company in Bombay. While other Indian mills produced cheap coarse yarn (and later cloth) using local short-staple cotton and cheap machinery imported from Britain, Tata did much better by importing expensive longer-stapled cotton from Egypt and buying more complex ring-spindle machinery from the United States to spin finer yarn that could compete with imports from Britain.

In the 1890s, he launched plans to move into heavy industry using Indian funding. The Raj did not provide capital, but, aware of Britain's declining position against the US and Germany in the steel industry, it wanted steel mills in India. It promised to purchase any surplus steel Tata could not otherwise sell. The Tata Iron and Steel Company (TISCO), now headed by his son Dorabji Tata (1859–1932), began constructing its plant at Jamshedpur in Bihar in 1908, using American technology, not British. According to The Oxford Dictionary of National Biography, TISCO became the leading iron and steel producer in India, and "a symbol of Indian technical skill, managerial competence, and entrepreneurial flair". The Tata family, like most of India's big businessmen, were Indian nationalists but did not trust the Congress because it seemed too aggressively hostile to the Raj, too socialist, and too supportive of trade unions.

==== Railways ====
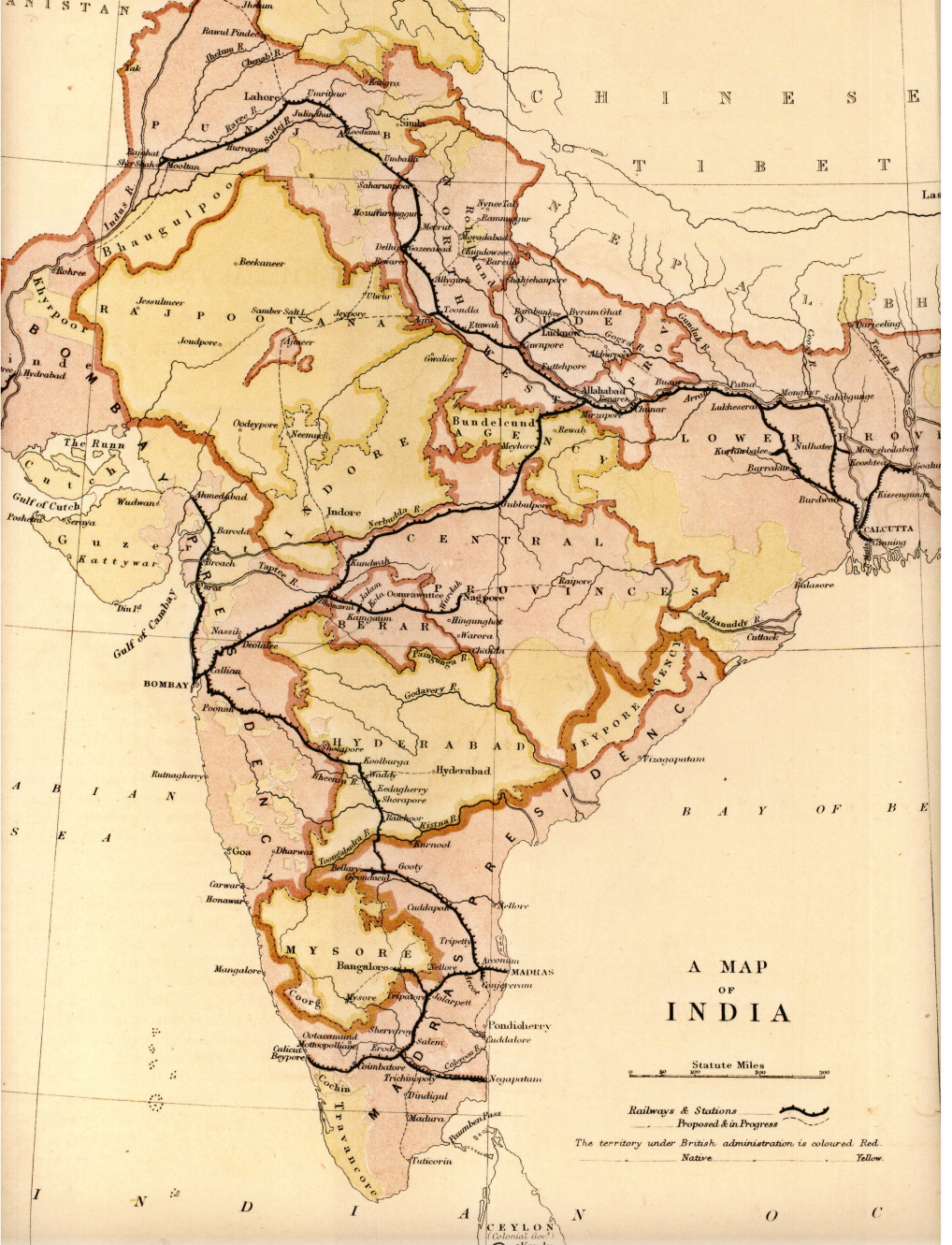
The railway network of India in 1871, all major cities, Calcutta, Bombay and Madras, as well as Delhi, are connected.

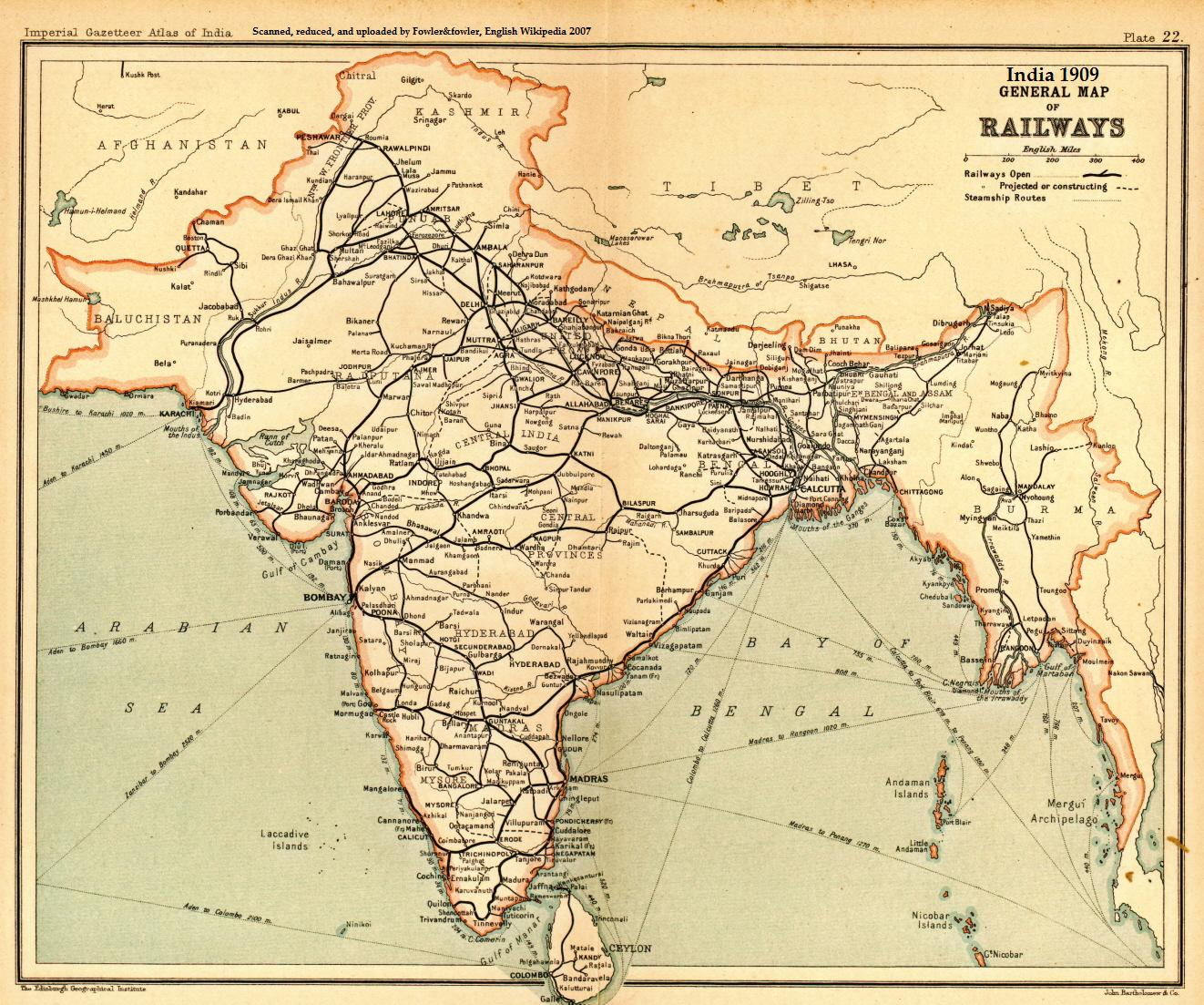
The railway network of India in 1909, when it was the fourth largest railway network in the world

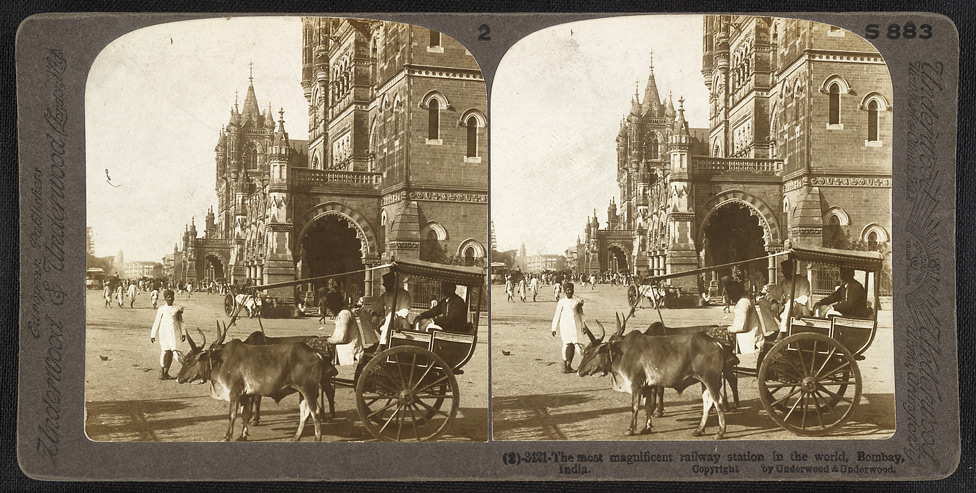
"The most magnificent railway station in the world", says the caption of the stereographic tourist picture of Victoria Terminus, Bombay, which was completed in 1888.

British India built a modern railway system in the late 19th century, which was the fourth largest in the world. At first the railways were privately owned and operated. They were run by British administrators, engineers and craftsmen. At first, only the unskilled workers were Indians. The East India Company (and later the colonial government) encouraged new railway companies backed by private investors under a scheme that would provide land and guarantee an annual return of up to 5% during the initial years of operation. The companies were to build and operate the lines under a 99-year lease, with the government having the option to buy them earlier. Two new railway companies, the Great Indian Peninsular Railway (GIPR) and the East Indian Railway Company (EIR) began to construct and operate lines near Bombay and Calcutta in 1853–54. The first passenger railway line in North India, between Allahabad and Kanpur, opened in 1859. Eventually, five British companies came to own all railway business in India, and operated under a profit maximization scheme. Further, there was no government regulation of these companies.

In 1854, Governor-General Lord Dalhousie formulated a plan to construct a network of trunk lines connecting the principal regions of India. Encouraged by the government guarantees, investment flowed in, and a series of new rail companies was established, leading to rapid expansion of the rail system in India. Soon several large princely states built their own rail systems and the network spread to the regions that became the modern-day states of Assam, Rajasthan and Andhra Pradesh. The route mileage of this network increased from 1,349 to 25,495 kilometres (838 to 15,842 mi) between 1860 and 1890, mostly radiating inland from the three major port cities of Bombay, Madras, and Calcutta.

After the Sepoy Rebellion in 1857, and subsequent Crown rule over India, the railways were seen as a strategic defence of the European population, allowing the military to move quickly to subdue native unrest and protect Britons. The railway thus served as a tool of the colonial government to control India as they were "an essential strategic, defensive, subjugators and administrative 'tool'" for the Imperial Project.

Most of the railway construction was done by Indian companies supervised by British engineers. The system was heavily built, using a broad gauge, sturdy tracks and strong bridges. By 1900 India had a full range of rail services with diverse ownership and management, operating on broad, metre and narrow gauge networks. In 1900, the government took over the GIPR network, while the company continued to manage it. During the First World War, the railways were used to transport troops and grain to the ports of Bombay and Karachi en route to Britain, Mesopotamia, and East Africa. With shipments of equipment and parts from Britain curtailed, maintenance became much more difficult; critical workers entered the army; workshops were converted to making munitions; the locomotives, rolling stock, and track of some entire lines were shipped to the Middle East. The railways could barely keep up with the increased demand. By the end of the war, the railways had deteriorated for lack of maintenance and were not profitable. In 1923, both GIPR and EIR were nationalised.

Headrick shows that until the 1930s, both the Raj lines and the private companies hired only European supervisors, civil engineers, and even operating personnel, such as locomotive engineers. The hard physical labour was left to the Indians. The colonial government was chiefly concerned with the welfare of European workers, and any Indian deaths were "either ignored or merely mentioned as a cold statistical figure." The government's Stores Policy required that bids on railway contracts be made to the India Office in London, shutting out most Indian firms. The railway companies purchased most of their hardware and parts in Britain. There were railway maintenance workshops in India, but they were rarely allowed to manufacture or repair locomotives.

After independence in 1947, forty-two separate railway systems, including thirty-two lines owned by the former Indian princely states, were amalgamated to form a single nationalised unit named the Indian Railways. India provides an example of the British Empire pouring its money and expertise into a very well-built system designed for military purposes (after the Rebellion of 1857), in the hope that it would stimulate industry. The system was overbuilt and too expensive for the small amount of freight traffic it carried. Christensen (1996), who looked at colonial purpose, local needs, capital, service, and private-versus-public interests, concluded that making the railways a creature of the state hindered success because railway expenses had to go through the same time-consuming and political budgeting process as did all other state expenses. Railway costs could therefore not be tailored to the current needs of the railways or of their passengers.

==== Irrigation ====
The British Raj invested heavily in infrastructure, including canals and irrigation systems. The Ganges Canal reached 560 kilometres (350 miles) from Haridwar to Cawnpore (now Kanpur), and supplied thousands of kilometres of distribution canals. By 1900 the Raj had the largest irrigation system in the world. One success story was Assam, a jungle in 1840 that by 1900 had 1,600,000 hectares (4,000,000 acres) under cultivation, especially in tea plantations. In all, the amount of irrigated land rose eightfold. Historian David Gilmour says:

By the 1870s the peasantry in the districts irrigated by the Ganges Canal were visibly better fed, housed and dressed than before; by the end of the century the new network of canals in the Punjab had produced an even more prosperous peasantry there.

=== Economic impact of the Raj ===
Historians continue to debate whether the long-term intention of British rule was to accelerate the economic development of India, or to distort and delay it. In 1780, the conservative British politician Edmund Burke raised the issue of India's position: he vehemently attacked the East India Company, claiming that Warren Hastings and other top officials had ruined the Indian economy and society. Indian historian Rajat Kanta Ray (1998) continues this line of attack, saying the new economy brought by the British in the 18th century was a form of "plunder" and a catastrophe for the traditional economy of the Mughal Empire. Ray accuses the British of depleting the food and money stocks and of imposing high taxes that helped cause the terrible Bengal famine of 1770, which killed a third of the people of Bengal.

P. J. Marshall shows that recent scholarship has reinterpreted the view that the prosperity of the formerly benign Mughal rule gave way to poverty and anarchy. He argues the British takeover did not make any sharp break with the past, which largely delegated control to regional Mughal rulers and sustained a generally prosperous economy for the rest of the 18th century. Marshall notes the British went into partnership with Indian bankers and raised revenue through local tax administrators and kept the old Mughal rates of taxation.

The East India Company inherited an onerous taxation system that took one-third of the produce of Indian cultivators. Instead of the Indian nationalist account of the British as alien aggressors, seizing power by brute force and impoverishing all of India, Marshall presents the interpretation (supported by many scholars in India and the West) that the British were not in full control but instead were players in what was primarily an Indian play and in which their rise to power depended upon excellent co-operation with Indian elites. Marshall admits that much of his interpretation is still highly controversial among many historians.

== Demography ==
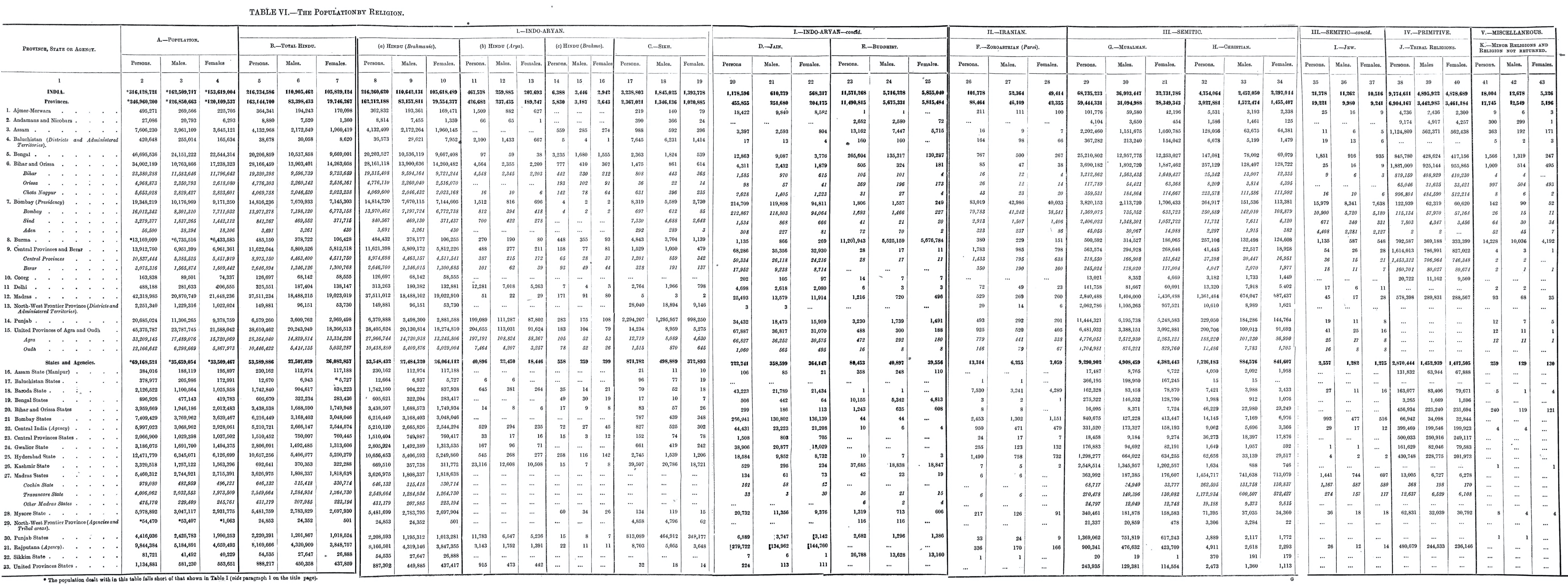
The 1921 census of British India shows 69 million Muslims and 217 million Hindus out of a total population of 316 million.

The population of the territory that became the British Raj was 100 million by 1600 and remained nearly stationary until the 19th century. The population of the Raj reached 255 million according to the first census taken in 1881 of India. Studies of India's population since 1881 have focused on such topics as total population, birth and death rates, growth rates, geographic distribution, literacy, the rural and urban divide, cities of a million, and the three cities with populations over eight million: Delhi, Greater Bombay, and Calcutta.

Mortality rates fell in the 1920–1945 era, primarily due to biological immunization. Other factors included rising incomes and better living conditions, improved nutrition, environmental improvements, and better official health policies and medical care. Severe overcrowding in the cities caused major public health problems, as noted in an official report from 1938:

In the urban and industrial areas... cramped sites, the high values of land and the necessity for the worker to live in the vicinity of his work ... all tend to intensify congestion and overcrowding. In the busiest centres houses are built close together, eave touching eave, and frequently back to back .... Space is so valuable that, in place of streets and roads, winding lanes provide the only approach to the houses. Neglect of sanitation is often evidenced by heaps of rotting garbage and pools of sewage, whilst the absence of latrines enhances the general pollution of air and soil.

== Famines, epidemics, and public health ==
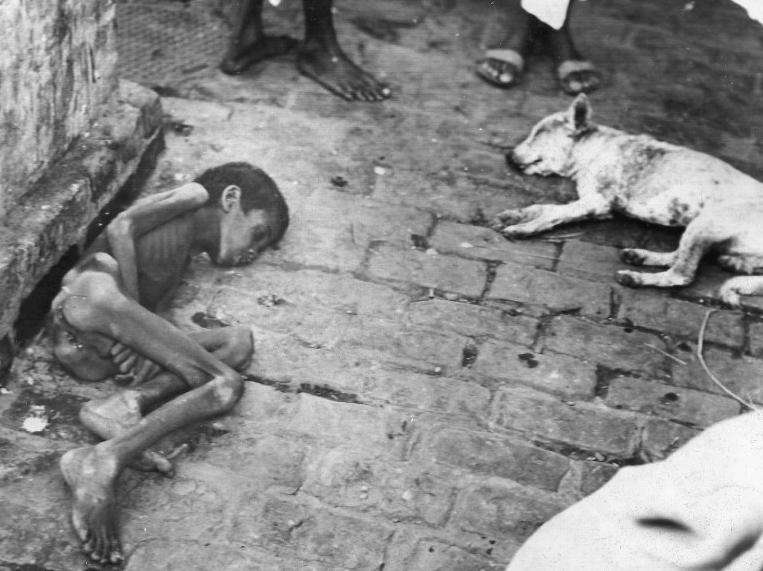
Child who starved to death during the Bengal famine of 1943

During the British Raj, India experienced a large number of major famines, including the Great Famine of 1876–1878, in which 6.1 million to 10.39 million Indians perished and the Indian famine of 1899–1900, in which 1.25 to 10 million Indians perished. The first cholera pandemic began in Bengal, then spread across India by 1820. Ten thousand British troops and countless Indians died during this pandemic. Estimated deaths in India between 1817 and 1860 exceeded 15 million. Another 23 million died between 1865 and 1917. The Third plague pandemic, which started in China in the middle of the 19th century, eventually spread to all inhabited continents and killed 10 million Indians in India alone. Waldemar Haffkine, who mainly worked in India, became the first microbiologist to develop and deploy vaccines against cholera and bubonic plague. In 1925, the Plague Laboratory in Bombay was renamed the Haffkine Institute. Fevers ranked as one of the leading causes of death in India in the 19th century. Britain's Sir Ronald Ross, working in the Presidency General Hospital in Calcutta, finally proved in 1898 that mosquitoes transmit malaria, while on assignment in the Deccan at Secunderabad, where the Centre for Tropical and Communicable Diseases is now named in his honour.

In 1881, there were around 120,000 leprosy patients. The central government passed the Lepers Act of 1898, which provided legal provision for forcible confinement of people with leprosy in India. Under the direction of Mountstuart Elphinstone a program was launched to propagate smallpox vaccination. Mass vaccination in India resulted in a major decline in smallpox mortality by the end of the 19th century. In 1849 nearly 13% of all Calcutta deaths were due to smallpox. Between 1868 and 1907, there were approximately 4.7 million deaths from smallpox. Sir Robert Grant directed his attention to establishing a systematic institution in Bombay for imparting medical knowledge to the natives. In 1860, Grant Medical College became one of the four recognised colleges for teaching courses leading to degrees (alongside Elphinstone College, Deccan College and Government Law College, Mumbai).

== Education ==
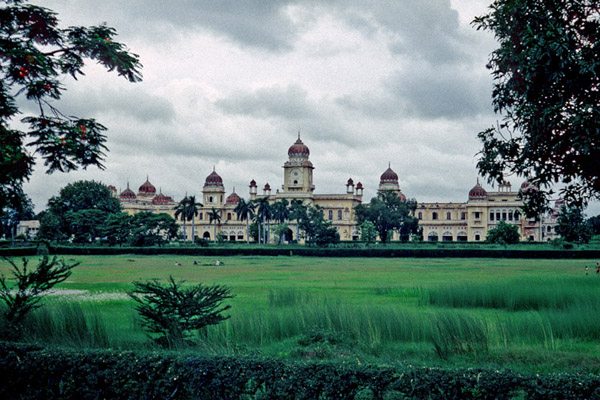
The University of Lucknow, founded by the British in 1867

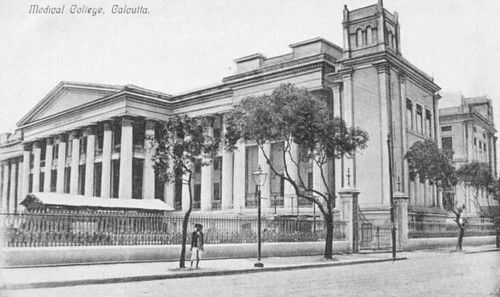
The University of Calcutta, established in 1857, is one of the three oldest modern state universities in India.

Universities in Calcutta, Bombay, and Madras were established in 1857, just before the Rebellion. By 1890 some 60,000 Indians had matriculated, chiefly in the liberal arts or law. About a third entered public administration, and another third became lawyers. The result was a very well-educated professional state bureaucracy. By 1887, of 21,000 mid-level civil service appointments, 45% were held by Hindus, 7% by Muslims, 19% by Eurasians (European father and Indian mother), and 29% by Europeans. Of the 1000 top-level civil services positions, almost all were held by Britons, typically with an Oxbridge degree. The government, often working with local philanthropists, opened 186 universities and colleges of higher education by 1911; they enrolled 36,000 students (over 90% men). By 1939 the number of institutions had doubled, and enrollment reached 145,000. The curriculum followed classical British standards of the sort set by Oxford and Cambridge and stressed English literature and European history. By the 1920s the student bodies had become hotbeds of Indian nationalism.

== See also ==
- British North America
- Colonial India
- Direct colonial rule
- Flags of British India
- Glossary of the British Raj (Hindi-Urdu words)
- Historiography of the British Empire
- Legislatures of British India
- List of governors-general of India

== Bibliography ==
=== Surveys ===
- Allan, J., T. Wolseley Haig, H. H. Dodwell. The Cambridge Shorter History of India (1934), 996 pp.
- Bandhu, Deep Chand. History of Indian National Congress (2003), 405 pp.
- Bandyopadhyay, Sekhar (2004), From Plassey to Partition: A History of Modern India, Orient Longman. pp. xx, 548., ISBN 978-81-250-2596-2.
- Bayly, C. A. (1990), Indian Society and the Making of the British Empire (The New Cambridge History of India), Cambridge and London: Cambridge University Press. pp. 248, ISBN 978-0-521-38650-0.
- Brendon, Piers (28 October 2008). The Decline and Fall of the British Empire, 1781-1997. Knopf Doubleday Publishing Group. ISBN 978-0-307-27028-3.
- Brown, Judith M. (1994) [First published 1984], Modern India: The Origins of an Asian Democracy, Oxford University Press. pp. xiii, 474, ISBN 978-0-19-873113-9.
- Bose, Sugata; Jalal, Ayesha (2004) [1998], Modern South Asia: History, Culture, Political Economy (2nd ed.), Routledge, ISBN 978-0-415-30787-1
- Chhabra, G. S. (2005) [1971], Advanced Study in the History of Modern India, vol. III (Revised ed.), New Delhi: Lotus Press, p. 2, ISBN 978-81-89093-08-2, archived from the original on 23 September 2023
- Copland, Ian (2001), India 1885–1947: The Unmaking of an Empire (Seminar Studies in History Series), Harlow and London: Pearson Longmans. pp. 160, ISBN 978-0-582-38173-5
- Coupland, Reginald. India: A Re-Statement (Oxford University Press, 1945)
- Dodwell H. H., ed. The Cambridge History of India. Volume 6: The Indian Empire 1858–1918. With Chapters on the Development of Administration 1818–1858 (1932) 660 pp. online edition; also published as vol 5 of the Cambridge History of the British Empire
- Gilmour, David. The British in India: A Social History of the Raj (2018); expanded edition of The Ruling Caste: Imperial Lives in the Victorian Raj (2007) Excerpt and text search
- Herbertson, A.J. and O.J.R. Howarth. eds. The Oxford Survey of the British Empire (6 vol 1914) online vol 2 on Asia pp. 1–328 on India
- James, Lawrence. Raj: The Making and Unmaking of British India (2000)
- Judd, Denis (2004), The Lion and the Tiger: The Rise and Fall of the British Raj, 1600–1947, Oxford and New York: Oxford University Press. pp. xiii, 280, ISBN 978-0-19-280358-0.
- Louis, William Roger, and Judith M. Brown, eds. The Oxford History of the British Empire (5 vol 1999–2001), with numerous articles on the Raj
- Low, D. A. (1993), Eclipse of Empire, Cambridge University Press, ISBN 978-0-521-45754-5
- Ludden, David E. (2002), India And South Asia: A Short History, Oxford: Oneworld, ISBN 978-1-85168-237-9
- Majumdar, Ramesh Chandra; Raychaudhuri, Hemchandra; Datta, Kalikinkar (1950), An advanced history of India
- Majumdar, R. C. ed. (1970). British paramountcy and Indian renaissance. (The History and Culture of the Indian People) Bombay: Bharatiya Vidya Bhavan.
- Mansingh, Surjit The A to Z of India (2010), a concise historical encyclopaedia
- Marshall, P. J. (2001), The Cambridge Illustrated History of the British Empire, 400 pp., Cambridge and London: Cambridge University Press., ISBN 978-0-521-00254-7.
- Markovits, Claude (2004), A History of Modern India, 1480–1950, Anthem Press, ISBN 978-1-84331-004-4, archived from the original on 22 September 2023
- Metcalf, Barbara D.; Metcalf, Thomas R. (2006), A Concise History of Modern India (Cambridge Concise Histories), Cambridge and New York: Cambridge University Press. pp. xxxiii, 372, ISBN 978-0-521-68225-1
- Moon, Penderel. The British Conquest and Dominion of India (2 vol. 1989) 1235 pp. the fullest scholarly history of political and military events from a British top-down perspective;
- Oldenburg, Philip (2007), "India: Movement for Freedom", Encarta Encyclopedia, archived from the original on 31 October 2009
- Panikkar, K. M. (1953). Asia and Western dominance, 1498–1945, by K.M. Panikkar. London: G. Allen and Unwin.
- Peers, Douglas M. (2006), India under Colonial Rule 1700–1885, Harlow and London: Pearson Longmans. pp. xvi, 163, ISBN 978-0-582-31738-3.
- Riddick, John F. The history of British India: a chronology (2006) excerpt and text search, covers 1599–1947
- Riddick, John F. Who Was Who in British India (1998), covers 1599–1947
- Robb, Peter (2002), A History of India, Palgrave Macmillan, ISBN 978-0-230-34549-2
- Sarkar, Sumit (2004) [1983], Modern India, 1885–1947, Delhi: Macmillan, ISBN 978-0-333-90425-1
- Smith, Vincent A. (1958) The Oxford History of India (3rd ed.) the Raj section was written by Percival Spear
- Somervell, D.C. The Reign of King George V, (1936) covers Raj 1910–35 pp. 80–84, 282–291, 455–464 online free
- Spear, Percival (1990) [1965], A History of India, Volume 2, New Delhi and London: Penguin Books. pp. 298, ISBN 978-0-14-013836-8.
- Stein, Burton (2010) [First published 1998], Arnold, David (ed.), A History of India (2nd ed.), John Wiley & Sons, ISBN 978-1-4051-9509-6.
- Thompson, Edward, and G.T. Garratt. Rise and Fulfilment of British Rule in India (1934) 690 pages; scholarly survey, 1599–1933 excerpt and text search
- Wolpert, Stanley (2004), A New History of India (7th ed.), Oxford and New York: Oxford University Press, ISBN 978-0-19-516677-4.
- Wolpert, Stanley, ed. Encyclopedia of India (4 vol. 2005) comprehensive coverage by scholars
- Wolpert, Stanley (2006), Shameful Flight: The Last Years of the British Empire in India, Oxford University Press, ISBN 978-0-19-515198-5

=== Specialised topics ===
- Baker, David (1993), Colonialism in an Indian Hinterland: The Central Provinces, 1820–1920, Delhi: Oxford University Press. pp. xiii, 374, ISBN 978-0-19-563049-7
- Bayly, Christopher (2000), Empire and Information: Intelligence Gathering and Social Communication in India, 1780–1870 (Cambridge Studies in Indian History and Society), Cambridge University Press. pp. 426, ISBN 978-0-521-66360-1
- Bayly, Christopher; Harper, Timothy (2005), Forgotten Armies: The Fall of British Asia, 1941–1945, Harvard University Press, ISBN 978-0-674-01748-1, archived from the original on 12 July 2023
- Bayly, Christopher; Harper, Timothy (2007), Forgotten Wars: Freedom and Revolution in Southeast Asia, Harvard University Press, ISBN 978-0-674-02153-2
- Bayly, Christopher Alan. Imperial Meridian: The British Empire and the World 1780–1830. (Routledge, 2016).
- Bose, Sudhindra (1916), Some Aspects of British Rule in India, Studies in the Social Sciences, vol. V, Iowa City: The University, pp. 79–81, archived from the original on 23 September 2023
- Bosma, Ulbe (2011), Emigration: Colonial circuits between Europe and Asia in the 19th and early 20th century, EGO – European History Online, Mainz: Institute of European History, retrieved: 25 March 2021 (pdf).
- Brown, Judith M. Gandhi: Prisoner of Hope (1991), scholarly biography
- Brown, Judith M.; Louis, Wm. Roger, eds. (2001), Oxford History of the British Empire: The Twentieth Century, Oxford University Press. pp. 800, ISBN 978-0-19-924679-3
- Buckland, C.E. Dictionary of Indian Biography (1906) 495 pp. full text.
- Carrington, Michael (May 2013), "Officers, Gentlemen, and Murderers: Lord Curzon's campaign against "collisions" between Indians and Europeans, 1899–1905", Modern Asian Studies, 47 (3): 780–819, doi:10.1017/S0026749X12000686, S2CID 147335168
- Chandavarkar, Rajnarayan (1998), Imperial Power and Popular Politics: Class, Resistance and the State in India, 1850–1950, (Cambridge Studies in Indian History & Society). Cambridge University Press. pp. 400, ISBN 978-0-521-59692-3
- Chatterji, Joya (1993), Bengal Divided: Hindu Communalism and Partition, 1932–1947, Cambridge University Press. pp. 323, ISBN 978-0-521-52328-8
- Copland, Ian (2002), Princes of India in the Endgame of Empire, 1917–1947, (Cambridge Studies in Indian History & Society). Cambridge University Press. pp. 316, ISBN 978-0-521-89436-4
- Das, Manmath Nath (1964). India under Morley and Minto: politics behind revolution, repression and reforms. G. Allen and Unwin. OCLC 411335.
- Davis, Mike (2001), Late Victorian Holocausts, Verso Books, ISBN 978-1-85984-739-8
- Dewey, Clive. Anglo-Indian Attitudes: The Mind of the Indian Civil Service (2003)
- Ewing, Ann. "Administering India: The Indian Civil Service", History Today, June 1982, 32#6 pp. 43–48, covers 1858–1947.
- Fieldhouse, David (1996), "For Richer, for Poorer?", in Marshall, P. J. (ed.), The Cambridge Illustrated History of the British Empire, Cambridge: Cambridge University Press. pp. 400, pp. 108–146, ISBN 978-0-521-00254-7, archived from the original on 23 September 2023
- Gilmartin, David. 1988. Empire and Islam: Punjab and the Making of Pakistan. University of California Press. 258 pages. ISBN 978-0-520-06249-8.
- Gilmour, David. Curzon: Imperial Statesman (2006) excerpt and text search.
- Gopal, Sarvepalli. British Policy in India 1858–1905 (2008)
- Gopal, Sarvepalli (1976), Jawaharlal Nehru: A Biography, Harvard U. Press, ISBN 978-0-674-47310-2
- Gopal, Sarvepalli. Viceroyalty of Lord Irwin 1926–1931 (1957).
- Gopal, Sarvepalli (1953), The Viceroyalty of Lord Ripon, 1880–1884, Oxford U. Press
- Gould, William (2004), Hindu Nationalism and the Language of Politics in Late Colonial India, Cambridge U. Press. pp. 320, ISBN 978-1-139-45195-6
- Grove, Richard H. (2007), "The Great El Nino of 1789–93 and its Global Consequences: Reconstructing an Extreme Climate Even in World Environmental History", The Medieval History Journal, 10 (1&2): 75–98, doi:10.1177/097194580701000203, hdl:1885/51009, S2CID 162783898
- Hall-Matthews, David (November 2008), "Inaccurate Conceptions: Disputed Measures of Nutritional Needs and Famine Deaths in Colonial India", Modern Asian Studies, 42 (6): 1189–1212, doi:10.1017/S0026749X07002892, S2CID 146232991
- Headrick, Daniel R. (1988), The tentacles of progress: technology transfer in the age of imperialism, 1850–1940, Oxford University Press, ISBN 0-19-505115-7
- Hyam, Ronald (2007), Britain's Declining Empire: The Road to Decolonisation, 1918–1968, Cambridge University Press, ISBN 978-0-521-86649-1
- Imperial Gazetteer of India vol. III (1907), The Indian Empire, Economic (Chapter X: Famine), pp. 475–502, Published under the authority of His Majesty's Secretary of State for India in Council, Oxford at the Clarendon Press. pp. xxx, 1 map, 552.
- The Imperial Gazetteer of India, vol. IV, Oxford: Clarendon Press, 1909
- Jalal, Ayesha (1993), The Sole Spokesman: Jinnah, the Muslim League and the Demand for Pakistan, Cambridge U. Press, 334 pages.
- Kaminsky, Arnold P. The India Office, 1880–1910 (1986) excerpt and text search, focus on officials in London.
- Khan, Yasmin (2007), The Great Partition: The Making of India and Pakistan, Yale U. Press, 250 pages, ISBN 978-0-300-12078-3
- Khan, Yasmin. India at War: The Subcontinent and the Second World War (2015), wide-ranging scholarly survey excerpt; also published as Khan, Yasmin. The Raj at War: A People's History of India's Second World War (2015), a major, comprehensive scholarly study
- Klein, Ira (July 2000), "Materialism, Mutiny and Modernization in British India", Modern Asian Studies, 34 (3): 545–580, doi:10.1017/S0026749X00003656, JSTOR 313141, S2CID 143348610
- Koomar, Roy Basanta (2009), The Labor Revolt in India, BiblioBazaar, LLC, pp. 13–14, ISBN 978-1-113-34966-8
- Kumar, Deepak. Science and the Raj: A Study of British India (2006).
- Lipsett, Chaldwell. Lord Curzon in India 1898–1903 (1903) excerpt and text search 128 pp.
- Low, D. A. (2002), Britain and Indian Nationalism: The Imprint of Ambiguity 1929–1942, Cambridge University Press. pp. 374, ISBN 978-0-521-89261-2
- MacMillan, Margaret. Women of the Raj: The Mothers, Wives, and Daughters of the British Empire in India (2007).
- Metcalf, Thomas R. (1991), The Aftermath of Revolt: India, 1857–1870, Riverdale Co. Pub. pp. 352, ISBN 978-81-85054-99-5
- Metcalf, Thomas R. (1997), Ideologies of the Raj, Cambridge University Press, pp. 256, ISBN 978-0-521-58937-6
- Moore, Robin J. (2001a), "Imperial India, 1858–1914", in Porter, Andrew N. (ed.), Oxford History of the British Empire, vol. III, Oxford University Press, pp. 422–446, ISBN 978-0-19-924678-6
- Moore, Robin J. "India in the 1940s", in Robin Winks, ed. Oxford History of the British Empire: Historiography, (2001b), pp. 231–242.
- Nehru, Jawaharlal (1946), Discovery of India, Delhi: Oxford University Press
- Porter, Andrew, ed. (2001), Oxford History of the British Empire: Nineteenth Century, Oxford University Press. pp. 800, ISBN 978-0-19-924678-6
- Raghavan, Srinath. India's War: World War II and the Making of Modern South Asia (2016). wide-ranging scholarly survey excerpt Archived 23 September 2023 at the Wayback Machine
- Rai, Lajpat (2008), England's Debt to India: A Historical Narrative of Britain's Fiscal Policy in India, BiblioBazaar, LLC, pp. 263–281, ISBN 978-0-559-80001-6
- Raja, Masood Ashraf (2010), Constructing Pakistan: Foundational Texts and the Rise of Muslim National Identity, 1857–1947, Oxford University Press, ISBN 978-0-19-547811-2
- Ramusack, Barbara (2004), The Indian Princes and their States (The New Cambridge History of India), Cambridge University Press. pp. 324, ISBN 978-0-521-03989-5
- Read, Anthony, and David Fisher; The Proudest Day: India's Long Road to Independence (W. W. Norton, 1999) Archive.org, borrowable
- Riddick, John F. The History of British India: A Chronology (2006) excerpt Archived 23 September 2023 at the Wayback Machine
- Riddick, John F. Who Was Who in British India (1998); 5000 entries excerpt.
- Satya, Laxman D. (2008). "British Imperial Railways in Nineteenth Century South Asia". Economic and Political Weekly. 43 (47): 69–77. ISSN 0012-9976. JSTOR 40278213.
- Shaikh, Farzana (1989), Community and Consensus in Islam: Muslim Representation in Colonial India, 1860–1947, Cambridge University Press. pp. 272., ISBN 978-0-521-36328-0.
- Talbot, Ian; Singh, Gurharpal, eds. (1999), Region and Partition: Bengal, Punjab and the Partition of the Subcontinent, Oxford University Press. pp. 420, ISBN 978-0-19-579051-1.
- Thatcher, Mary. Respected Memsahibs: an Anthology (Hardinge Simpole, 2008).
- Tinker, Hugh (October 1968), "India in the First World War and after", Journal of Contemporary History, 3 (4, 1918–19: From War to Peace): 89–107, doi:10.1177/002200946800300407, JSTOR 259853, S2CID 150456443.
- Voigt, Johannes. India in The Second World War (1988).
- Wolpert, Stanley A. (2007), "India: British Imperial Power 1858–1947 (Indian nationalism and the British response, 1885–1920; Prelude to Independence, 1920–1947)", Encyclopædia Britannica, archived from the original on 7 June 2008.
- Wolpert, Stanley A. Jinnah of Pakistan (2005).
- Wolpert, Stanley A. Tilak and Gokhale: revolution and reform in the making of modern India (1962) full text online.

=== Economic and social history ===
- Anstey, Vera. The economic development of India (4th ed. 1952), 677 pp. thorough scholarly coverage; focus on 20th century down to 1939.
- Ballhatchet, Kenneth. Race, Sex, and Class under the Raj: Imperial Attitudes and Policies and Their Critics, 1793–1905 (1980).
- Chaudhary, Latika, et al. eds. A New Economic History of Colonial India (2015).
- Derbyshire, I. D. (1987), "Economic Change and the Railways in North India, 1860–1914", Population Studies, 21 (3): 521–545, doi:10.1017/s0026749x00009197, JSTOR 312641, S2CID 146480332
- Chaudhuri, Nupur. "Imperialism and Gender" in Encyclopedia of European Social History, edited by Peter N. Stearns (vol. 1, 2001), pp. 515–521. Online emphasis on Raj.
- Dutt, Romesh C. The Economic History of India under early British Rule (1901); The Economic History of India in the Victorian Age (1906) online
- Gupta, Charu, ed. Gendering Colonial India: Reforms, Print, Caste and Communalism (2012)
- Hyam, Ronald. Empire and Sexuality: The British Experience (1990).
- Kumar, Dharma; Desai, Meghnad (1983), The Cambridge Economic History of India, vol. 2, Cambridge University Press, ISBN 978-0-521-22802-2, archived from the original on 23 September 2023
- Lockwood, David. The Indian Bourgeoisie: A Political History of the Indian Capitalist Class in the Early Twentieth Century (I.B. Tauris, 2012) 315 pages; focus on Indian entrepreneurs who benefited from the Raj, but ultimately sided with the Indian National Congress.
- O'Dell, Benjamin D. (2014). "Beyond Bengal: Gender, Education, and the Writing of Colonial Indian History". Victorian Literature and Culture. 42 (3): 535–551. doi:10.1017/S1060150314000138. S2CID 96476257.
- Roy, Tirthankar (Summer 2002), "Economic History and Modern India: Redefining the Link", The Journal of Economic Perspectives, 16 (3): 109–130, doi:10.1257/089533002760278749, JSTOR 3216953
- Sarkar, J. (2013, reprint). Economics of British India ... 3rd ed. Calcutta: M.C. Sarkar & Sons.
- Simmons, Colin (1985), "'De-Industrialization', Industrialization and the Indian Economy, c. 1850–1947", Modern Asian Studies, 19 (3): 593–622, doi:10.1017/s0026749x00007745, JSTOR 312453, S2CID 144581168
- Sinha, Mrinalini. Colonial Masculinity: The 'Manly Englishman' and the 'Effeminate Bengali' in the Late Nineteenth Century (1995).
- Strobel, Margaret. European Women and the Second British Empire (1991).
- Tirthankar, Roy (2014), "Financing the Raj: the City of London and colonial India 1858–1940", Business History, 56 (6): 1024–1026, doi:10.1080/00076791.2013.828424, S2CID 153716644
- Tomlinson, Brian Roger (1993), The Economy of Modern India, 1860–1970, New Cambridge History of India, vol. III.3, Cambridge University Press, p. 109, ISBN 978-0-521-36230-6
- Tomlinson, Brian Roger (October 1975), "India and the British Empire, 1880–1935", Indian Economic and Social History Review, 12 (4): 337–380, doi:10.1177/001946467501200401, S2CID 144217855

=== Historiography and memory ===
- Andrews, C.F. (2017). India and the Simon Report. Routledge reprint of 1930 first edition. p. 11. ISBN 978-1-315-44498-7.
- Durant, Will (2011, reprint). The case for India. New York: Simon and Schuster.
- Ellis, Catriona (2009). "Education for All: Reassessing the Historiography of Education in Colonial India". History Compass. 7 (2): 363–375. doi:10.1111/j.1478-0542.2008.00564.x.
- Gilmartin, David (2015). "The Historiography of India's Partition: Between Civilization and Modernity". The Journal of Asian Studies. 74 (1): 23–41. doi:10.1017/s0021911814001685. S2CID 67841003.
- Major, Andrea (2011). "Tall tales and true: India, historiography and British imperial imaginings". Contemporary South Asia. 19 (3): 331–332. doi:10.1080/09584935.2011.594257. S2CID 145802033.
- Mantena, Rama Sundari. The Origins of Modern Historiography in India: Antiquarianism and Philology (2012).
- Moor-Gilbert, Bart. Writing India, 1757–1990: The Literature of British India (1996) on fiction written in English.
- Mukherjee, Soumyen. "Origins of Indian Nationalism: Some Questions on the Historiography of Modern India". Sydney Studies in Society and Culture 13 (2014). online.
- Nawaz, Rafida, and Syed Hussain Murtaza. "Impact of Imperial Discourses on Changing Subjectivities in Core and Periphery: A Study of British India and British Nigeria". Perennial Journal of History 2.2 (2021): 114–130. online.
- Nayak, Bhabani Shankar. "Colonial world of postcolonial historians: reification, theoreticism, and the neoliberal reinvention of tribal identity in India". Journal of Asian and African Studies 56.3 (2021): 511–532. online.
- Parkash, Jai. "Major trends of historiography of revolutionary movement in India – Phase II". (PhD dissertation, Maharshi Dayanand University, 2013). online.
- Philips, Cyril H. ed. Historians of India, Pakistan and Ceylon (1961), reviews the older scholarship.
- Stern, Philip J (2009). "History and Historiography of the English East India Company: Past, Present, and Future". History Compass. 7 (4): 1146–1180. doi:10.1111/j.1478-0542.2009.00617.x.
- Stern, Philip J. "Early Eighteenth-Century British India: Antimeridian or antemeridiem?". Journal of Colonialism and Colonial History 21.2 (2020), pp. 1–26, focus on C.A. Bayly, Imperial Meridian online.
- Whitehead, Clive (2005). "The historiography of British imperial education policy, Part I: India". History of Education. 34 (3): 315–329. doi:10.1080/00467600500065340. S2CID 144515505.
- Winks, Robin, ed. Historiography (1999), vol. 5 in William Roger Louis, ed. The Oxford History of the British Empire.
- Winks, Robin W. The Historiography of the British Empire-Commonwealth: Trends, Interpretations and Resources (1966).
- Young, Richard Fox, ed. (2009). Indian Christian Historiography from Below, from Above, and in Between India and the Indianness of Christianity: Essays on Understanding – Historical, Theological, and Bibliographical – in Honor of Robert Eric Frykenberg.

=== Miscellaneous ===
- Steinberg, S. H. (1947). The Statesman's Year-Book: Statistical and Historical Annual of the States of the World for the Year 1947. Springer. ISSN 0081-4601.
