= List of governors-general of India =

The Regulating Act 1773 created the office with the title of Governor-General of the Presidency of Fort William, or Governor-General of Bengal to be appointed by the Court of Directors of the East India Company (EIC). The Court of Directors assigned a Council of Four (based in India) to assist the Governor-General, and the decision of the council was binding on the Governor-General from 1773 to 1784.

The Charter Act 1833 re-designated the office with the title of Governor-General of India. William Bentinck was the first to be designated as the Governor-general of India in 1833.

After the Indian Rebellion of 1857, the company rule in India was brought to an end, but the British India along with princely states came under the direct rule of the British Crown. The Government of India Act 1858 created the office of Secretary of State for India in 1858 to oversee the affairs of India, which was advised by a new Council of India with 15 members (based in London). The existing Council of Four was formally renamed as the Council of Governor-General of India or Executive Council of India. The Council of India was later abolished by Government of India Act 1935.

Following the adoption of the Government of India Act 1858, the Governor-General representing the Crown became known as the Viceroy. The designation 'Viceroy', although it was most frequently used in ordinary parlance, had no statutory authority, and was never employed by Parliament. Although the Proclamation of 1858 announcing the assumption of the government of India by the Crown referred to Lord Canning as "first Viceroy and Governor-General", none of the Warrants appointing his successors referred to them as 'Viceroys', and the title, which was frequently used in Warrants dealing with precedence and in public notifications, was one of ceremonies used in connection with the state and social functions of the Sovereign's representative. The Governor-General continued to be the sole representative of the Crown, and the Government of India continued to be vested in the appointments of Governor-General of India which were made by the British Crown upon the advice of Secretary of State for India. The office of Governor-General continued to exist as a ceremonial post in each of the new dominions of India and Pakistan, until they adopted republican constitutions in 1950 and 1956 respectively.

== List of governors-general ==
=== Fort William (Bengal) and India, 1773–1857 ===
No.	Governor-General (Lifespan)	Term of office		Notable events	Appointed by
Governors-General of the Presidency of Fort William (Bengal), 1773–1833
1	Warren Hastings (1732–1818)	20 October 1773 (Note: Originally joined on 28 April 1772.)	8 February 1785	Regulating Act 1773; First Rohilla War (1773–1774); Supreme Court of Judicature at Fort William (1774) was established; Formation of Supreme Council of Bengal (1774); First Anglo-Maratha War (1775–1782); Formed Amini Commission (1776); Founded Calcutta Madrasa (Aliah University) (1780); James Augustus Hicky's Bengal Gazette (first Indian newspaper published (1780); Second Anglo-Mysore war (1780–1784); Asiatic Society of Bengal was established by Sir William Jones (1784); Pitt's India Act (1784); Creation of collector post; The first Governor General to be prosecuted for impeachment. As a consequence of his involvement in First Rohilla War; Experimentation on land settlements; Ended providing pension to the Mughal Emperor Shah Alam II; Abolished the Dual System in Bengal (which was introduced by Robert Clive); Moved Treasury from Murshidabad to Calcutta; Abolished Dastak system (which was introduced by Robert Clive); English translation of the Bhagwat Gita by Charles Wilkins	George III
—	Sir John Macpherson, 1st Baronet (acting) (1745–1821)	8 February 1785	12 September 1786		George III
2	Charles Cornwallis, 2nd Earl Cornwallis (Note: Earl Cornwallis from 1762; created Marquess Cornwallis (1792).) (1738–1805)	12 September 1786	28 October 1793	Established lower courts and appellate courts; Third Anglo-Mysore war (1790–1792); Sanskrit Vidyalaya at Benaras (now Varanasi) established by Johnathan Duncan (then Governor of Bombay) (1791); Permanent Settlement in Bihar and Bengal (1793); Introduction of Cornwallis Code (1793); Introduction of Civil Services in India	George III
3	Sir John Shore, Bt. (1751–1834)	28 October 1793	18 March 1798	Policy of Non-intervention; Charter Act 1793; Second Rohilla War 1794; Battle of Kharda between Nizam and Marathas (1795)	George III
—	Lt. Gen Alured Clarke (acting) (1744–1832)	18 March 1798	18 May 1798		George III
4	Richard Wellesley, 1st Marquess Wellesley (Note: Created Marquess Wellesley (1799).) (1760–1842)	18 May 1798	30 July 1805	Introduction of Subsidiary Alliance (1798); Fourth Anglo Mysore War 1799; Censorship Act, 1799; Took over the administration of Tanjore (1799), Surat (1800) and Carnatica (1801); Fort William College at Calcutta (1800); The Subsidiary Treaty of Bassein (1802) and Second Anglo-Maratha War (1803–1805); Raj Bhavan at Calcutta was established (1803)	George III
5	Charles Cornwallis, 1st Marquess Cornwallis (1738–1805)	30 July 1805	5 October 1805		George III
—	Sir George Barlow, 1st Baronet (acting) (1762–1847)	10 October 1805	31 July 1807	Sepoy mutiny at Vellore (1806) (prelude to the Indian Rebellion of 1857); Bank of Calcutta (1806) established (later Imperial Bank of India, now State Bank of India)	George III
6	Gilbert Elliot-Murray-Kynynmound, 1st Baron Minto (1751–1814)	31 July 1807	4 October 1813	Treaty of Amritsar (1809) with Ranjit Singh; Treaty of Eternal Friendship (1809) with Talpur Rulers of Sindh; Charter Act 1813	George III
7	Francis Rawdon-Hastings (Note: Earl of Moira prior to being created Marquess of Hastings in 1816.) (1754–1826)	4 October 1813	9 January 1823	Ended the policy of Non-intervention; Anglo-Nepalese War (1814–1816) ended with the signing of Treaty of Sugauli (1816); Third Anglo-Maratha War (1816–1818) and the abolition of Peshwaship; Hindu College (now Presidency University) at Calcutta (1817); The Pindari War (1817–1818) (the complete destruction of the Pindaris); Subversion of Peshwa Baji Rao II and annexation of his territories to the Bombay Presidency (1818); Establishment of Ryotwari System in Madras Presidency (1820) by the governor Thomas Munro, 1st Baronet; Establishment of Mahalwari System in Northern India by Holt Mackenzie (1822); Bengal Tenancy Act was passed (1822); General Committee of Public Instruction was formed (1823)	George III
—	John Adam (acting) (1779–1825)	9 January 1823	1 August 1823	Licensing Regulations	George IV
8	William Amherst, 1st Earl Amherst (Note: Created Earl Amherst in 1826.) (1773–1857)	1 August 1823	13 March 1828	Barrackpore mutiny of 1824; Establishment of Sanskrit College at Calcutta (1824); First Anglo-Burmese War (1824–1826) (East India Company defeats Burmese King Bagyidaw and annexes Assam, Manipur, Arakan and Tenasserim); Treaty of Yandabo, 1826 (East India Company humiliates and extracts 1 million Pounds from the Burmese King Bagyidaw)	George IV
—	William Butterworth Bayley (acting) (1782–1860)	13 March 1828	4 July 1828		George IV
Governors-General of India, 1833–1858
1	Lord William Bentinck (1774–1839)	4 July 1828	20 March 1835	First Governor General of India; Bengal Sati Regulation, 1829; Suppression of Thuggee (1829–1835); Kol Rebellion (1831); Barasat Uprising (1831), led by Titumir; Annexation of Mysore (1831), Coorg (1834), and central Cachar (1834); Charter Act 1833 (administrative reforms as well as formalising the non-discrimination in employment of Indians by religion); English Education Act 1835 and introduction of English as a medium of instruction. English was also introduced by the Bengal government in the Calcutta Madrasa in 1829; Medical College and Hospital, Kolkata (1835); Abolition of the provincial courts of appeal and circuit set by Cornwallis, appointment of commissioners of revenue and circuit; Mahalwari System in Central India, Punjab and western Uttar Pradesh; Brahmo samaj established by Ram Mohan Roy	William IV
—	Charles Metcalfe, Baronet (acting) (1785–1846)	20 March 1835	4 March 1836	Repealed 1823 Licensing Regulations; Known as Liberator of India Press; Establishment of Calcutta Public Library (1836) (currently known as National Library of India)	William IV
2	George Eden, 1st Earl of Auckland (Note: Created Earl of Auckland in 1839.) (1784–1849)	4 March 1836	28 February 1842	Tripartite Treaty (1838) between British, Shah Shuja and Maharaja Ranjit Singh against Dost Muhammad Khan; First Bengali daily newspaper Sambad Prabhakar was published (1839); Tattwabodhini Sabha was formed by Debendranath Tagore (1839); First Anglo Afghan War (1840–1842) (Retreating British Army massacred by Afghan militias during the 1842 retreat from Kabul); Bank of Bombay (1840) established (later Imperial Bank of India, now State Bank of India)	William IV
3	Edward Law, 2nd Baron Ellenborough (1790–1871)	28 February 1842	June; 1844	Gwalior War (1843) (British defeat Marathas); Bank of Madras (1843) established (later Imperial Bank of India, now State Bank of India); Conquest and annexation of Sind Province (1843); Indian Slavery Act, 1843	Victoria
—	William Wilberforce Bird (acting) (1784–1857)	June; 1844	23 July 1844		Victoria
4	Henry Hardinge (Note: Created Viscount Hardinge in 1846.) (1785–1856)	23 July 1844	12 January 1848	The First Anglo-Sikh War (1845–1846) (British Empire defeats the Sikh Empire and confiscate major portion of its territory); Treaty of Lahore (1846) (British confiscated Kashmir from the Sikhs and sold it to Raja of Jammu for 75 lakh rupees); Treaty of Bhairowal (1846); Establishment of Roorkee Engineering College (1847)	Victoria
5	James Broun-Ramsay, 10th Earl of Dalhousie (Note: Created Marquess of Dalhousie 1849.) (1812–1860)	12 January 1848	28 February 1856	Doctrine of Lapse (1848); Second Anglo-Sikh War (1848–1849) (The British totally defeated the Sikh Empire and annexed Punjab); Bethune Collegiate School (1849) (was also known as Calcutta Female School) was established by John Elliot Drinkwater Bethune; Caste Disabilities Removal Act, 1850; First telegraph line was laid between Diamond Harbour to Calcutta (1851); Second Anglo-Burmese War (1852) (The sole aim of Dalhousie was to humiliate and annex more of Burmese Territories. Burma was attacked unprovoked); Charter Act, 1853; First Passenger train between Bombay and Thane (1853); Charles Wood Despatch (1854); Post Office Act, 1854; Established Public Works Department (1854); Santhal Rebellion (1855) (15,000 Santhals were killed by the British Army during the rebellion. Elephants were used to destroy Santhal Dwellings); Annexation of Oudh on the grounds of alleged internal misrule (1856); Establishment of summer capital at Shimla; Banned female infanticide completely and human sacrifice in Odisha and Maharashtra	Victoria
6	Charles Canning, 2nd Viscount Canning (Note: Created Earl Canning 1859.) (1812–1862)	28 February 1856	31 October 1858	Hindu Widows' Remarriage Act, 1856 (drafted by James Broun-Ramsay, Earl of Dalhousie); Indian Rebellion of 1857; University of Calcutta, University of Bombay, and University of Madras were set up (1857)	Victoria

=== Governors-General and Viceroys of India, 1858–1947 ===
No.	Governor-General or Viceroy (Lifespan)	Term of office		Notable events	Secretary of State for India	Prime Minister
Governors-General and Viceroys of India, 1858–1947
1	Charles Canning, 2nd Viscount Canning (1812–1862)	1 November 1858	21 March 1862	Queen Victoria's Proclamation (1 November 1858) and The Government of India Act, 1858; Formation of Imperial Civil Services (1858); Indigo Revolt in Bengal (1859–1860); White mutiny by the European troops (1859); Enactment of Indian Penal Code (1860); Indian High Courts Act 1861; Indian Councils Act, 1861; Indian Civil Service Act, 1861; Police Act, 1861; Establishment of Archaeological Survey of India (1861); System of Budget was introduced; Introduced Portfolio System which gave foundation for Cabinet System	Lord Stanley; Charles Wood	Edward Smith-Stanley, 14th Earl of Derby; Viscount Palmerston
2	James Bruce, 8th Earl of Elgin (1811–1863)	21 March 1862	20 November 1863	Establishment of Calcutta High Court (2 July), Bombay High Court (14 August) and Madras High Court (15 August) (1862); Opened up Qing China and Japan to Western trade; Compelled the Qing to sign the Convention of Peking, annexing the Kowloon Peninsula to the British crown colony of Hong Kong	Charles Wood	Viscount Palmerston
—	Robert Napier (acting) (1810–1890)	21 November 1863	2 December 1863		Charles Wood	Viscount Palmerston
—	William Denison (acting) (1804–1871)	2 December 1863	12 January 1864		Charles Wood	Viscount Palmerston
3	Sir John Lawrence, 1st Baronet (1811–1879)	12 January 1864	12 January 1869	Devised and followed the policy of ‘masterly inactivity’ towards Afghanistan.; Bhutan War (1864–1865) (The British defeated an undefended Bhutan and annexed Assam and Bengal Duars); Establishment of Shimla as India's summer capital (1864); Establishment of Allahabad High Court (1866); Famine Commission was constituted (1867) under Henry Campbell due to Orissa famine of 1866; Tenancy Act was passed in Punjab and Oudh (1868)	Charles Wood; George Robinson, Earl de Grey; Viscount Cranborne; Stafford Northcote; George Campbell, 8th Duke of Argyll	Viscount Palmerston; John Russell, 1st Earl Russell; Edward Smith-Stanley, 14th Earl of Derby; Benjamin Disraeli; William Ewart Gladstone
4	Richard Bourke, 6th Earl of Mayo (1822–1872)	12 January 1869	8 February 1872	Keshub Chandra Sen establishes Indian Reform Association (1870); Started Financial decentralization (1870); Enacted IPC amendment-Sedition Act 1870 to tackle Wahabi Movement; Assassinated by Sher Ali Afridi (1872); Started the Census in India (1872); Established the Department of Agriculture and Commerce (1872); Established Statistical Survey of India (1872); Opening of Rajkumar college in Rajkot and Mayo College at Ajmer for political training of Indian Princes	George Campbell, 8th Duke of Argyll	William Ewart Gladstone
—	John Strachey (acting) (1823–1907)	9 February 1872	23 February 1872		George Campbell, 8th Duke of Argyll	William Ewart Gladstone
—	Francis Napier, 10th Lord Napier (acting) (1819–1898)	24 February 1872	3 May 1872		George Campbell, 8th Duke of Argyll	William Ewart Gladstone
5	Thomas Baring, 2nd Baron Northbrook (1826–1904)	3 May 1872	12 April 1876	He suppressed Kuka rebellion in Punjab led by Ram Singh (1872); Jyotiba Phule launches the Satyashodhak Samaj in Maharashtra (1873) against the caste system and the Untouchability practice; Trial of Gaekwad of Baroda (1874); Muhammadan Anglo-Oriental College founded by Sir Syed Ahmed Khan (1875); Prince of Wales Edward VII visited India (1875); Dramatic Performances Act, 1876; He resigned (1876), being asked by the British Prime Minister Benjamin Disraeli to make a treaty with the Emir of Afghanistan Sher Ali Khan	George Campbell, 8th Duke of Argyll; Robert Gascoyne-Cecil, 3rd Marquess of Salisbury	William Ewart Gladstone; Benjamin Disraeli
6	Robert Bulwer-Lytton, 1st Earl of Lytton (1831–1891)	12 April 1876	8 June 1880	Royal Titles Act, 1876 by which Queen Victoria assumed the title of 'Empress of India'; Great Famine of 1876–1878, a 'Famine Commission' was constituted under Richard Strachey (1878); First Delhi Durbar (of three) (1877); Vernacular Press Act, 1878; Arms Act, 1878; Second Anglo-Afghan War, (1878–1880); Treaty of Gandamak signed (1879); Decreased the maximum age of appearing in civil services from 21 to 19	Robert Gascoyne-Cecil, 3rd Marquess of Salisbury; Gathorne Gathorne-Hardy, Viscount Cranbrook; Marquess of Hartington	Benjamin Disraeli; William Ewart Gladstone
7	George Robinson, 1st Marquess of Ripon (1827–1909)	8 June 1880	13 December 1884	First Factory Act (1881); Negotiable Instruments Act, 1881; First complete Census in India (1881); Repeal of the Vernacular Press Act (1882); Establishment of Panjab University (1882); Government resolution on local self-government (1882); Appointment of Education Commission under Sir William Wilson Hunter (1882); Ilbert Bill (1883); Passed Famine codes (1883); Increased the maximum age of appearing in civil services from 18 to 21	Marquess of Hartington; John Wodehouse, 1st Earl of Kimberley	William Ewart Gladstone
8	Frederick Hamilton-Temple-Blackwood, 1st Earl of Dufferin (1826–1902)	13 December 1884	10 December 1888	Formation of Indian National Congress (1885); Bengal Tenancy Act (1885); Third Anglo-Burmese War (1885); Burma was made a province of India, with Rangoon as its capital (1886)	John Wodehouse, 1st Earl of Kimberley; Lord Randolph Churchill; John Wodehouse, 1st Earl of Kimberley; R. A. Cross, 1st Viscount Cross	William Ewart Gladstone; Robert Gascoyne-Cecil, 3rd Marquess of Salisbury; William Ewart Gladstone; Robert Gascoyne-Cecil, 3rd Marquess of Salisbury
9	Henry Petty-Fitzmaurice, 5th Marquess of Lansdowne (1845–1927)	10 December 1888	21 January 1894	Age of Consent Act, 1891 was passed to prohibit the marriages of girl child under the age of 12; Second Factory Act 1891; Indian Councils Act 1892; Setting up the Durand Commission (1893) (India-Afghanistan)	R. A. Cross, 1st Viscount Cross; John Wodehouse, 1st Earl of Kimberley; Henry Fowler	Robert Gascoyne-Cecil, 3rd Marquess of Salisbury; William Ewart Gladstone; Archibald Primrose, 5th Earl of Rosebery
10	Victor Bruce, 9th Earl of Elgin (1849–1917)	21 January 1894	6 January 1899	Spread of Bubonic plague in Bombay (1896); Indian famine of 1896–1897; Establishment of the Ramakrishna Mission by Swami Vivekananda at Calcutta (1897); Assassination of two British officials (Walter Charles Rand and Ayerst) by the Chapekar brothers (1897)	Henry Fowler; Lord George Hamilton	Archibald Primrose, 5th Earl of Rosebery; Robert Gascoyne-Cecil, 3rd Marquess of Salisbury
11	George Curzon, 1st Baron Curzon of Kedleston (Note: Oliver Russell, 2nd Baron Ampthill was acting Governor-General in 1904.) (1859–1925)	6 January 1899	18 November 1905	Indian famine of 1899–1900; Munda (Ulgulan) rebellion led by Birsa Munda (1899–1900); Department of Agriculture was constituted (1901); Creation of North-West Frontier Province (1901); Appointment of Police Commission under Andrew Frazer (1902); Appointment of Raleigh University Commission (1902) (Indian Universities Act, 1904 was passed as per the recommendation of this commission); Second Delhi Durbar (of three) (1903); Younghusband expedition to Tibet under Francis Younghusband (1903–1904); Benaras Hindu Girls School was established by Annie Besant (1904); Archaeological Department was established under Ancient Monuments Preservation Act 1904; Official Secrets Act 1904 to curb free press; Agricultural Research Institute at Pusa in Bihar was established (1905); Partition of Bengal (1905); Swadeshi Movement (1905–1911) against Partition of Bengal by Lal Bal Pal-Aurbindo Ghosh	Lord George Hamilton; William St John Brodrick	Robert Gascoyne-Cecil, 3rd Marquess of Salisbury; Arthur Balfour
Appointed by Edward VII (1901–1910)
12	Gilbert Elliot-Murray-Kynynmound, 4th Earl of Minto (1845–1914)	18 November 1905	23 November 1910	Establishment of Muslim League by Aga Khan III and Khwaja Salimullah (Nawab of Dhaka) (1906); Foundation of Jugantar revolutionary group in Bengal (1906); Foundation stone of 'Victoria Memorial' laid (1906); Split in Congress (1907) (in Surat session); Satyendra Prasanna Sinha became first Indian member to be appointed in Viceroy's Executive Council; Seditious meetings (prohibition) Act 1907 to curb the extremist movement; Jamsetji Tata established TISCO (1907); Newspapers Act 1908; Morley–Minto reforms (1909); Indian Press Act, 1910	William St John Brodrick; John Morley; Robert Crewe-Milnes, Earl of Crewe	Arthur Balfour; Henry Campbell-Bannerman; H. H. Asquith
Appointed by George V (1910–1936)
13	Charles Hardinge, 1st Baron Hardinge of Penshurst (1858–1944)	23 November 1910	4 April 1916	Third Delhi Durbar (1911); Annulment of Partition of Bengal by King George V (1911); Transfer of capital from Calcutta to New Delhi (1911); Partition of Bengal to form Bihar and Orissa province (1912); World War I (1914–1918); Komagata Maru incident (1914); McMahon border line was created between India and China (1914); Ghadar Mutiny (1915); Mahatma Gandhi came back to India from South Africa (1915); Foundation of Hindu Mahasabha by Madan Mohan Malviya (1915); Foundation of Banaras Hindu University (1916)	Robert Crewe-Milnes, Earl of Crewe; John Morley, 1st Viscount Morley of Blackburn; Robert Crewe-Milnes, 1st Marquess of Crewe; Austen Chamberlain	H. H. Asquith
14	Frederic Thesiger, 1st Viscount Chelmsford (1868–1933)	4 April 1916	2 April 1921	Formation of Indian Home Rule movement by Bal Gangadhar Tilak and Annie Besant (1916); First Women's University (SNDT Women's University) at Pune was founded by Dhondo Keshav Karve (1916); Lucknow Pact (1916) (between Indian National Congress and Muslim League); Champaran Satyagraha (1917), the first satyagraha movement led by Mahatma Gandhi in British India; August Declaration, 1917; Saddler University Commission or Calcutta Commission (1917); Kheda Satyagraha of 1918; Montagu–Chelmsford Reforms (1919); Government of India Act 1919; Rowlatt Act (1919); Jallianwala Bagh massacre (1919); Khilafat Movement (1919–1920) (later merged with Non-cooperation movement in 1920); Foundation of Aligarh Muslim University (1920); Non-cooperation movement (1920–1922); Imperial Bank of India (now State Bank of India established in 1921)	Austen Chamberlain; Edwin Montagu	H. H. Asquith; David Lloyd George
15	Rufus Isaacs, 1st Marquess of Reading (1860–1935)	2 April 1921	3 April 1926	Annulment of Press Act of 1910 and Rowlatt Act of 1919; Malabar rebellion (also known as Moplah Rebellion), first Ethnic Rebellion (1921); Rabindranath Tagore founded Visva-Bharati University (1921); Chauri Chaura incident (1922) and withdrawal of Non-cooperation movement by Mahatma Gandhi; Formation of Swaraj Party (1923); Appointment of Lee Commission (1923) on public services reforms; Railway budget was separated from general budget since 1924 (this tradition continued till 2016); Kakori train robbery (1925); Foundation of the Rashtriya Swayamsevak Sangh by K. B. Hedgewar (1925); Foundation of the Communist Party of India in Kanpur (1925)	Edwin Montagu; William Peel, Viscount Peel; Sydney Olivier, 1st Baron Olivier; F. E. Smith, 1st Earl of Birkenhead	David Lloyd George; Bonar Law; Stanley Baldwin; Ramsay MacDonald; Stanley Baldwin
16	E. F. L. Wood, 1st Baron Irwin (1881–1959)	3 April 1926	18 April 1931	Simon Commission (1928); Nehru Report (1928); Death of Lala Lajpat Rai (1928); Fourteen Points of Jinnah (1929); Purna Swaraj declaration (1929); Meerut Conspiracy Case (1929); Bombing in Central Legislative Assembly by Bhagat Singh and Batukeshwar Dutt (8 April 1929); "Deepavali Declaration" (31 October 1929, to grant India dominion status in due course); Appointment of "Hartog Committee" (1929) to survey the growth of education in British India; Launching of Civil disobedience movement with Salt March (1930); Dharasana Satyagraha (1930); First Round Table Conferences (1930); Allahabad Address by Sir Muhammad Iqbal (1930); Chittagong armoury raid (1930); Gandhi–Irwin Pact (1931); Execution of Bhagat Singh, Shivaram Rajguru, and Sukhdev Thapar (1931)	F. E. Smith, 1st Earl of Birkenhead; William Peel, Viscount Peel	Stanley Baldwin; Ramsay MacDonald
—	George Goschen, 2nd Viscount Goschen (acting) (1866–1952)	29 June 1929	11 November 1929		William Peel, Viscount Peel, William Wedgwood Benn	Stanley Baldwin; Ramsay MacDonald
17	Freeman Freeman-Thomas, 1st Earl of Willingdon (1866–1941)	18 April 1931	18 April 1936	Second Round Table Conference (1931); Announcement of Communal Award by Ramsay MacDonald (1932); Poona Pact between Mahatma Gandhi and B. R. Ambedkar (1932); Third Round Table Conference (1932); Pakistan Declaration (1933); Foundation of Congress Socialist Party (1934); Reserve Bank of India established by passing The Reserve Bank of India Act 1934; Government of India Act 1935; Formation of All India Kisan Sabha (1936)	William Wedgwood Benn; Samuel Hoare; Lawrence Dundas, 2nd Marquess of Zetland	Ramsay MacDonald; Stanley Baldwin
Appointed by Edward VIII (1936)
18	Victor Hope, 2nd Marquess of Linlithgow (1887–1952)	18 April 1936	1 October 1943	Indian provincial elections (1937); Indian entry into World War II (1939); Day of Deliverance (1939); Formation of All India Forward Bloc (1939); Lahore Resolution (1940); August Offer (1940); Cripps Mission (1942); Formation of Indian Legion (1942); Quit India Movement (1942); Formation of Indian National Army (1942); Bengal famine (1943)	Lawrence Dundas, 2nd Marquess of Zetland; Leo Amery	Stanley Baldwin; Neville Chamberlain; Winston Churchill
Appointed by George VI (1936–1947) (as Emperor of India)
19	Archibald Wavell, 1st Viscount Wavell (1883–1950)	1 October 1943	21 February 1947	C. R. formula (1944); Simla Conference (1945); World War II ended (1945); Indian National Army (INA) trials (1945–1946); Cabinet Mission (1946); Direct Action Day (16 August 1946); Interim Government was formed (1946); Royal Indian Navy mutiny (1946)	Leo Amery; Frederick Pethick-Lawrence, 1st Baron Pethick-Lawrence	Winston Churchill; Clement Attlee
20	Louis Mountbatten, 1st Viscount Mountbatten of Burma (1900–1979)	21 February 1947	15 August 1947	Indian Independence Act 1947 (18 July 1947); Radcliffe Commission was appointed under the chairmanship of Cyril Radcliffe to demarcate the border line of Bengal Presidency and Punjab Province	Frederick Pethick-Lawrence, 1st Baron Pethick-Lawrence; William Hare, 5th Earl of Listowel	Clement Attlee

=== Governors-General of the Dominion of India, 1947–1950 ===
No.	Governor-General (Lifespan)	Term of office		Notable events	Prime Minister
Governors-General of the Dominion of India, 1947–1950
Appointed by George VI (1947–1950) (as King of India)
1	Louis Mountbatten, 1st Viscount Mountbatten of Burma (Note: Created Earl Mountbatten of Burma on 28 October 1947.) (1900–1979)	15 August 1947	21 June 1948	First Governor-General of the Union of India	Jawaharlal Nehru
2	Chakravarti Rajagopalachari (1878–1972)	21 June 1948	26 January 1950	Last Governor-General of India, before the office was permanently abolished (1950); First and only Indian-born Governor-General of India	Jawaharlal Nehru

== Timeline and tenures ==
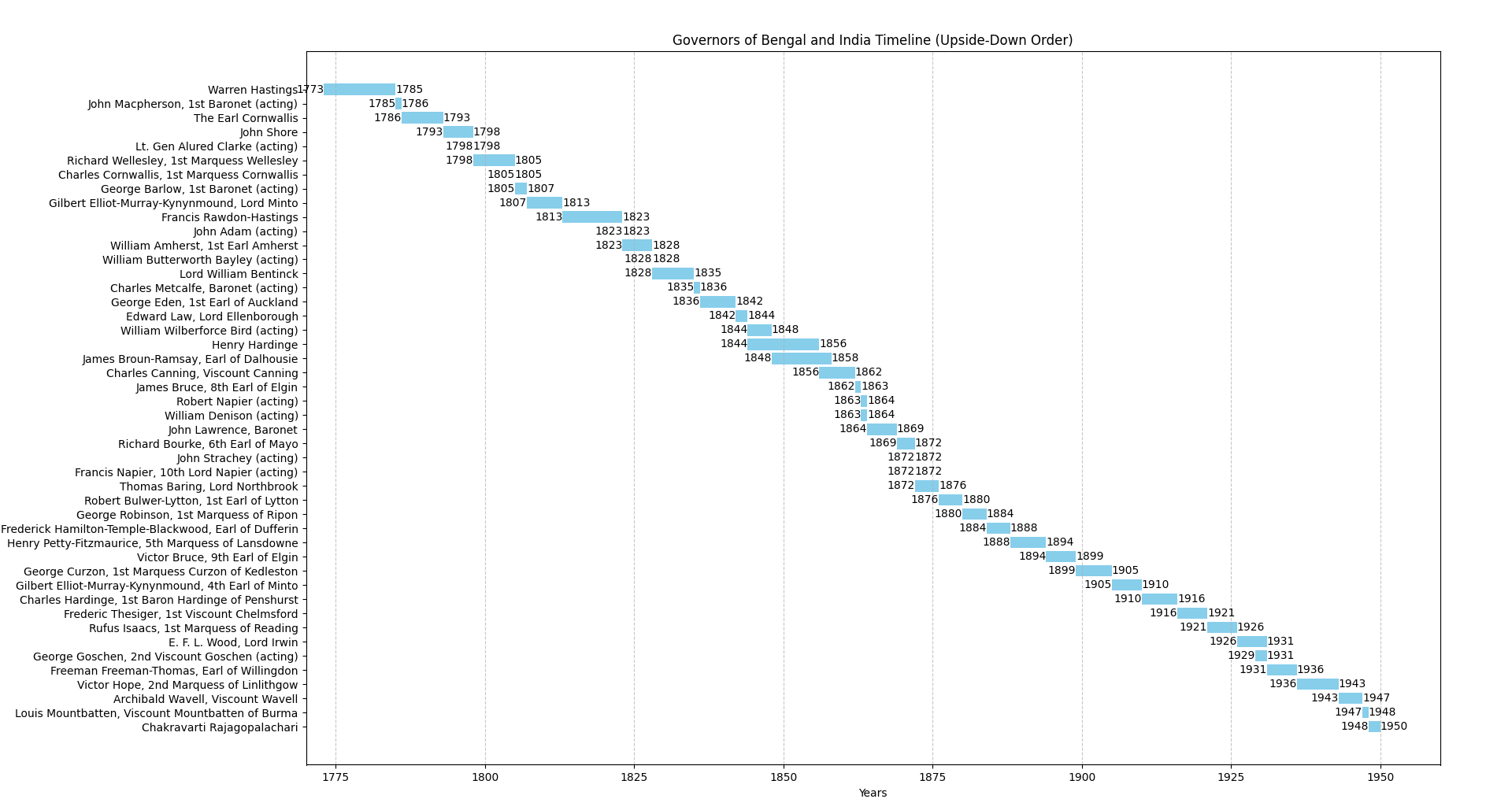
Timeline of governors and governors-general

Tenures of governors and governors-general

== See also ==
- List of governors of Bengal Presidency
- Council of India
- Secretary of State for India
- List of presidents of India
- Governor-general
