= Indian High Courts Act 1911 =

Act of the Parliament of the United Kingdom

Indian High Courts Act 1911 (Note: Section 5.)
- Act of Parliament
- Parliament of the United Kingdom
- Long title: An Act to amend the Indian High Courts Act, 1861.
- Citation: 1 & 2 Geo. 5. c. 18
- Territorial extent: United Kingdom

Dates
- Royal assent: 18 August 1911
- Commencement: 18 August 1911 (Note: The Acts of Parliament (Commencement) Act 1793.)
- Repealed: 1 January 1916
Other legislation
Amends	Indian High Courts Act 1861
Repealed by	Government of India Act 1915

Status: Repealed

Text of statute as originally enacted

The Indian High Courts Act 1911 (1 & 2 Geo. 5. c. 18) was an act of the Parliament of the United Kingdom that amended the Indian High Courts Act 1861 (24 & 25 Vict. c. 104). Notable changes to existing legislation include an increase in the number of judges of high court as well as the ability of government to establish additional high courts across British India.

== Provisions ==
=== Section 1 - Increased number of Judges of High Court ===
The maximum number of judges to serve an Indian High Court was increased from sixteen to twenty. Previously enacted regulations, such as those set forth by §2 of the Indian High Courts Act 1861 (24 & 25 Vict. c. 104), remained in effect.

=== Section 2 - Power to establish additional High Courts ===
The powers granted to His Majesty the King under section 16 of the Indian High Courts Act 1861 (24 & 25 Vict. c. 104) were expanded to allow for the establishment of additional High Courts across British India. Previously, only four courts had been established. Incidental, consequential or supplemental alterations to local or existing jurisdictions were to be made by means of order or patent so as to ensure the administrative superintendence of the newly established High Courts. Here, too, previously enacted regulations remained in effect.

=== Section 3 - Power to appoint Temporary Judges ===
Subject to the provisions of section 2 of the Indian High Courts Act 1861 (24 & 25 Vict. c. 104), as amended by this act, it was to be lawful for the Governor General in Council to appoint additional judges to High Courts ″as required by necessity or circumstance.″ Whilst appointed for no more than two years, temporary judges were to be granted powers no different from those allowed to the judges appointed by the monarch.

=== Section 4 - Salaries ===
The salaries of any judges or temporary judges appointed under this act were to be paid out of the Revenues of India.

=== Section 5 - Short Title ===
This act was to be cited as the Indian High Courts Act 1911. Together with the acts of 1861 and 1865, this act was to be cited as the Indian High Courts Act, 1861 to 1911.

== Supplemental notes ==
=== Legislation referenced ===
The Indian High Courts Act 1861

Section 2 of the act specified the qualifications and salaries of judges serving the High Courts.

Section 15 of the act established High Courts' measures of administrative superintendence over the courts subject to their appellate jurisdiction.

Section 16 of the act granted His Majesty the King the power to establish an additional High Court at Allahabad.

== Subsequent developments ==
The whole act was repealed by section 130 of, and the fourth schedule to, the Government of India Act 1915 (5 & 6 Geo. 5. c. 61), which came into force on 1 January 1916.
