= Constabulary (Ireland) Act 1866 =

Act of the Parliament of the United Kingdom

Constabulary (Ireland) Act 1866 (Note: The citation of this act by this short title was authorised by section 1 of, and the first schedule to, the Short Titles Act 1896. Due to the repeal of those provisions it is now authorised by section 19(2) of the Interpretation Act 1978.)
- Act of Parliament
- Parliament of the United Kingdom
- Long title: An Act to amend an Act to consolidate the Laws relating to the Constabulary Force in Ireland.
- Citation: 29 & 30 Vict. c. 103
- Territorial extent: United Kingdom

Dates
- Royal assent: 10 August 1866
- Commencement: 10 August 1866 (Note: The Acts of Parliament (Commencement) Act 1793.)
- Repealed: 5 November 1993
Other legislation
Amends	Irish Constabulary Act 1847
Amended by	Constabulary (Ireland) Act 1874; Statute Law Revision Act 1875; Statute Law Revision Act 1878; Statute Law Revision Act 1950
Repealed by	Statute Law (Repeals) Act 1993

Status: Repealed

Text of statute as originally enacted

Revised text of statute as amended

The Constabulary (Ireland) Act 1866 (29 & 30 Vict. c. 103) was an act of the Parliament of the United Kingdom that amended the laws relating to the constabulary force in Ireland.

The act regulated the pensions of the Royal Irish Constabulary.

== Subsequent developments ==
The whole act was repealed by section 1(1) of, and group 1 of part I of schedule 1 to, the Statute Law (Repeals) Act 1993, which came into force on 5 November 1993.
