= Government of India Act 1919 =

Act of the Parliament of the United Kingdom

Government of India Act 1919 (Note: Section 47(1).)}
- Parliament of the United Kingdom
- Long title: An Act to make further provision with respect to the Government of India.
- Citation: 9 & 10 Geo. 5. c. 101
- Territorial extent: United Kingdom; British India

Dates
- Royal assent: 23 December 1919
- Commencement: (Note: Section 47(2).)
- Repealed: 27 May 1976
Other legislation
Amends	Government of India Act 1915; Government of India (Amendment) Act 1916
Amended by	Government of India (Indian Navy) Act 1927
Repealed by	Government of India Act 1935; Statute Law (Repeals) Act 1976

Status: Repealed

Text of statute as originally enacted

The Government of India Act 1919 (9 & 10 Geo. 5. c. 101) was an act of the Parliament of the United Kingdom. It was passed to expand participation of Indians in the government of India. The act embodied the reforms recommended in the report of the Secretary of State for India, Edwin Montagu, and the Viceroy, Chelmsford. The act covered ten years, from 1919 to 1929. This act began the genesis of responsible government in India. It was set to be reviewed by the Simon Commission in 10 years.

The act received royal assent on 23 December 1919. On the same day the King-Emperor issued a proclamation which reviewed the course of parliamentary legislation for India and the intent of the act:

"The Acts of 1773 and 1784 were designed to establish a regular system of administration and justice under the East India Company. The Act of 1833 opened the door for Indians to public office and employment. The Act of 1858 transferred the administration from the Company to the Crown and laid the foundations of public life which exist in India today. The Act of 1861 sowed the seed of representative institutions, and the seed was quickened into life by the Act of 1909. The Act which has now become law entrusts the elected representative of the people with a definite share in the Government and points the way to full responsible Government hereafter".

The act provided a dual form of government (a "diarchy") for the major provinces. In each such province, control of some areas of government, the "transferred list", were given to a government of ministers answerable to the provincial council. The 'transferred list ' included agriculture, supervision of local government, health, and education. The provincial councils were enlarged.

At the same time, all other areas of government (the 'reserved list') remained under the control of the Viceroy. The 'reserved list' included defence (the military), foreign affairs, and communications.

The Imperial Legislative Council was enlarged and reformed. It became a bicameral legislature for all India. The lower house was the Legislative Assembly of 145 members, of which 104 were elected and 41 were nominated, with a tenure of three years. The upper house was the Council of State, consisting of 34 elected and 26 nominated members, with a tenure of five years.

== Essential characteristics ==
Salient features of the act were as follows:

1. This act had a separate preamble which declared that the objective of the British Government was the gradual introduction of responsible government in India.
2. Diarchy was introduced at the provincial level. Diarchy means a dual set of governments; one is accountable, the other is not accountable. Subjects of the provincial government were divided into two groups. One group was reserved, and the other group was transferred. The reserved subjects were controlled by the British Governor of the province; the transferred subjects were given to the Indian ministers of the province.
3. The Government of India Act 1919 made a provision for classification of the central and provincial subjects. The act kept the income tax as a source of revenue to the central government. However, for Bengal and Bombay, to meet their objections, a provision to assign them 25% of the income tax was made.
4. No bill of the legislature could be deemed to have been passed unless assented to by the viceroy. The latter could, however, enact a bill without the assent of the legislature.
5. This act made the central legislature bicameral. The lower house was the Legislative Assembly, with 145 members serving three-year terms (the model for today's Lok Sabha); the upper house was the Council of State with 60 members serving five-year terms (the model for today's Rajya Sabha)
6. The act provided for the establishment of a Public Service Commission in India for the first time.
7. This act also made a provision that a statutory commission would be set up at the end of 10 years after the act was passed which shall inquire into the working system of the government. The Simon commission of 1927 was an outcome of this provision.
8. The communal representation was extended and Sikhs, Europeans and Anglo-Indians were included. The franchise (right of voting) was granted to the limited number of only those who paid minimum of Rs. 3000 "tax" to the government.
9. The seats were distributed among the provinces not upon the basis of the population but upon the basis of their importance in the eyes of the government, on the basis of communities, and the property was one of the main basis to determine a franchisee. Those people who had property, taxable income and paid land revenue of Rs. 3,000 were entitled to vote.
10. The financial powers of the central legislature were also very much limited. The budget was to be divided into two categories, votable and non-votable. The votable items covered only one-third of the total expenditure. Even in this sphere, the Governor-General was empowered to restore any grant refused or reduced by the legislature if in his opinion the demand was essential for the discharge of his responsibilities. Thus the Government of India Act 1919 provided for partial transfer of power to the electorate through the system of diarchy. It also prepared the ground for Indian federalism, as it identified the provinces as units of fiscal and general administration.

The Indian National Congress rejected the act, however some leaders such as Annie Besant, G. S. Khaparde, Bipin Chandra Pal, Surendranath Banerjee, Vithalbhai Patel, Motilal Nehru, Narsimha Chintaman Kelkar and Tej Bahadur Sapru accepted the act and were ready to cooperate with the government. Surendranath Banerjee and Tej Bahadur Sapru formed Indian Liberal Federation and were normally referred as "Liberals". Others like Nehru, Patel, and Kelkar formed the Swaraj Party and got elected to the central legislative council. Madan Mohan Malaviya supported the reforms and Muhammad Ali Jinnah resigned from Indian National Congress.

== Subsequent developments ==
The whole act was repealed by section 1(1) of, and part VII of schedule 1 to, the Statute Law (Repeals) Act 1976.

== Significance ==
The Government of India Act 1919, based on the Montagu-Chelmsford Report, is a landmark in the constitutional history of British India:

- It was the first Act to explicitly state that the objective of British policy was the gradual introduction of responsible government in India — a historic acknowledgement that had never appeared in any previous legislation.
- It introduced the system of Dyarchy (dual governance) at the provincial level, dividing subjects into two lists — Reserved subjects (law and order, finance, land revenue, irrigation) administered by the British Governor through his executive council, and Transferred subjects (education, health, agriculture, local government) administered by Indian ministers responsible to the provincial legislature.
- For the first time, the principle of responsible government was applied to the executive branch of provincial administration — Indian ministers could be removed by a vote of no confidence in the provincial legislature, marking the first democratic accountability of the executive in Indian history.
- The Imperial Legislative Council was replaced by a bicameral legislature — consisting of the Central Legislative Assembly (lower house, 145 members, 3-year tenure) and the Council of State (upper house, 60 members, 5-year tenure) — with a majority of elected members in both houses.
- The franchise was significantly expanded — approximately 5 million Indians were given the right to vote based on property and tax qualifications. For the first time, a limited number of Indian women were also given the right to vote in certain provinces.
- Out of eight members of the Viceroy's Executive Council, three were required to be Indians — a meaningful, if limited, increase in Indian representation at the highest executive level.
- A Public Service Commission was established for the first time, laying the foundation for a merit-based civil service recruitment system independent of political patronage.
- The Act provided for the establishment of a Statutory Commission to review the working of the act after ten years — this led to the formation of the Simon Commission in 1927.
- The system of separate electorates was extended beyond Muslims to include Sikhs, Indian Christians, Anglo-Indians, and Europeans — broadening the scope of communal representation introduced by the Indian Councils Act 1909.
- The Act created political consciousness among Indians on an unprecedented scale — as elections were held under the new framework, millions of Indians participated in the political process for the first time, laying the groundwork for mass political mobilisation.

== Limitations ==
Despite its significance, the Government of India Act 1919 was widely criticised and fell far short of Indian nationalist aspirations:

- The Dyarchy system was fundamentally flawed — the division of subjects between reserved and transferred was arbitrary and unworkable in practice. Indian ministers had no control over finances or the bureaucracy, leading to constant friction. Ministers could be — and often were — overruled by the Governor on matters he deemed special.
- The Viceroy retained absolute authority at the centre — the central legislature had no control over the Governor-General and his Executive Council, and 75% of the budget remained non-votable, severely limiting parliamentary financial oversight.
- The Indian National Congress rejected the act as wholly inadequate. Bal Gangadhar Tilak described the Montford reforms as a unworthy and disappointing — a sunless dawn, while Annie Besant called them unworthy of England to offer and India to accept.
- The act was accompanied almost simultaneously by the Rowlatt Act of 1919, which authorised the government to imprison any person without trial — passed despite unanimous opposition from every Indian member of the Central Legislative Council. This gross contradiction between reform and repression fatally undermined Indian confidence in the new Act.
- The franchise remained extremely limited — only about 5 million out of a population of over 300 million could vote, leaving the vast majority of Indians entirely excluded from the political process.
- The allocation of seats in the Central Legislature to provinces was based on perceived British "importance" of a province — military importance, commercial importance — rather than population, introducing a fundamental distortion into the representative framework.
- The extension of separate electorates to additional communities further deepened communal divisions, worsening the effects first seen after the Morley-Minto Reforms of 1909.
- The Jallianwala Bagh massacre of April 1919, in which General Dyer ordered troops to fire on unarmed civilians, occurring in the same year as the act, destroyed whatever goodwill the reforms might otherwise have generated and massively accelerated the Indian nationalist movement towards non-cooperation.
- Congress boycotted the first elections held under the act in 1921, and the Swaraj Party, founded by Motilal Nehru and Chittaranjan Das in 1923, sought to obstruct the legislature from within — reflecting widespread Indian rejection of the act's inadequate provisions.

== Subsequent developments ==
The whole act, so far as unrepealed by the Government of India Act 1935 (25 & 26 Geo. 5. c. 42), was repealed by section 1(1) of, and part VII of schedule 1 to, the Statute Law (Repeals) Act 1976, which came into force on 27 May 1976.

== See also ==
- British India
- British Raj
- History of Bangladesh
- History of India
- History of Pakistan
- Governor-General of India
- Government of India Act (disambiguation)
- India Office
- Montagu–Chelmsford Reforms
- Secretary of State for India
