= Government of India Act 1912 =

Act of the Parliament of the United Kingdom

Government of India Act 1912 (Note: Section 1.)
- Act of Parliament
- Parliament of the United Kingdom
- Long title: An Act to make such amendments in the Law relating to the Government of India as are consequential on the appointment of a separate Governor of Fort William in Bengal, and other administrative changes in the local government of India.
- Citation: 2 & 3 Geo. 5. c. 6
- Territorial extent: United Kingdom

Dates
- Royal assent: 25 June 1912
- Commencement
- Repealed: 1 January 1916
Other legislation
Amends	East India Company Act 1793; Government of India Act 1833; Indian Councils Act 1861; Indian Councils Act 1909
Repealed by	Government of India Act 1915

Status: Repealed

Text of statute as originally enacted

The Government of India Act 1912 (2 & 3 Geo. 5. c. 6) was an act of the Parliament of the United Kingdom, which made changes to the governance of British India. It received royal assent on 25 June 1912.

The act addressed several problems related to the reorganization of Bengal. In 1905, the Bengal Presidency was divided in two, and the eastern portion combined with Assam Province to become the new province of Eastern Bengal and Assam. The division generated considerable opposition and unrest, and in 1911 Bengal was reorganized again into three provinces - Bengal (present-day West Bengal and Bangladesh), Bihar and Orissa, and Assam.

The first section of the act modified the powers of the newly appointed Governor of Bengal. Until 1912, the Governor-General of India also served as Governor of Bengal Presidency. In March 1912, the Secretary of State for India proclaimed that the reunified Bengal Province would be a province under its own governor. The Act gave the new governor the same powers as the governors of Bombay and Madras, including acting as governor-general in the governor-general's absence, the salary of the governor and his council, and the number and qualifications of members of the executive councils.

The second section of the act permitted the immediate creation of a legislative council for the new province of Bihar and Orissa, and amended the Indian Councils Act 1909 (9 Edw. 7. c. 4) to eliminate Parliamentary review of newly created legislative councils for provinces under a lieutenant-governor.

The third section of the act permitted the creation of legislative councils for provinces under chief commissioners. This authority was used to establish a legislative council for Assam Province on 14 November 1912, and for the Central Provinces on 10 November 1913.

== Subsequent developments ==
The whole act was repealed by section 130 of, and the fourth schedule to, the Government of India Act 1915 (5 & 6 Geo. 5. c. 61), which came into force on 1 January 1916.
