= Government of India Act 1915 =

Act of the Parliament of the United Kingdom

Government of India Act 1915 (Note: Section 135.)
- Act of Parliament
- Parliament of the United Kingdom
- Long title: An Act to consolidate enactments relating to the Government of India.
- Citation: 5 & 6 Geo. 5. c. 61
- Territorial extent: United Kingdom

Dates
- Royal assent: 29 July 1915
- Commencement: 1 January 1916 (Note: Section 135.)
- Repealed: 1 April 1937
Other legislation
Amends	See § Repealed enactments
Repeals/revokes	See § Repealed enactments
Amended by	Government of India (Amendment) Act 1916
Repealed by	Government of India Act 1935

Status: Repealed

Text of statute as originally enacted

The Government of India Act 1915 (5 & 6 Geo. 5. c. 61) was an act of the Parliament of the United Kingdom, which consolidated prior acts of Parliament concerning British India into a single act. It was passed in July 1915 and went into effect on 1 January 1916.

Section 130 of the act, and the fourth schedule to, the act repealed 47 enactments, starting with the East India Company Act 1770 (10 Geo. 3. c. 47), and replaced them with a single act containing 135 sections and five schedules. It was introduced first to the House of Lords, where it was referred to a joint committee of Parliament chaired by Lord Loreburn. The committee removed several provisions which went beyond the simple consolidation of existing law.

Government of India (Amendment) Act 1916 (Note: Section 8(1).)
- Act of Parliament
- Parliament of the United Kingdom
- Long title: An Act to amend certain enactments relating to the government of India, and to remove doubts as to the validity of certain Orders in Council made for India.
- Citation: 6 & 7 Geo. 5. c. 37
- Territorial extent: United Kingdom; British Raj

Dates
- Royal assent: 23 August 1916
- Commencement: 1 September 1916 (Note: Section 8(2).)
- Repealed: 5 November 1993
Other legislation
Amends	Criminal Law (India) Act 1815; Government of India Act 1915
Repeals/revokes	East India Company Act 1772; East India Company Act 1784; East India Company Act 1786
Amended by	Government of India Act 1919
Repealed by	Statute Law (Repeals) Act 1993

Status: Repealed

Text of statute as originally enacted

A supplemental act, mostly technical in nature and including several of the provisions struck out of the consolidation act, was introduced and passed in 1916, becoming the Government of India (Amendment) Act 1916 (6 & 7 Geo. 5. c. 37).

The 1915 act and its supplemental act the following year "made the English statute law relating to India easier to understand, and therefore easier to amend." The Government of India Act 1919 (9 & 10 Geo. 5. c. 101) made substantial changes to the law.

== Provisions ==
=== Repealed enactments ===
Section 130 of the act repealed 47 enactments, listed in the fourth schedule to the act.

Citation	Short title	Extent of repeal
10 Geo. 3. c. 47	East India Company Act 1770	The whole act.
13 Geo. 3. c. 63	East India Company Act 1772	The whole act, except sections forty-two, forty-three and forty-five.
21 Geo. 3. c. 70	East India Company Act 1780	The whole act, except section eighteen.
26 Geo. 3. c. 57	East India Company Act 1786	Section thirty-eight.
33 Geo. 3. c. 52	East India Company Act 1793	The whole act.
37 Geo. 3. c. 142	East India Act 1797	The whole act, except section twelve.
39 & 40 Geo. 3. c. 79	Government of India Act 1800	The whole act.
53 Geo. 3. c. 155	East India Company Act 1813	The whole act.
55 Geo. 3. c. 84	Indian Presidency Towns Act 1815	The whole act.
4 Geo. 4. c. 71	Indian Bishops and Courts Act 1823	The whole act.
6 Geo. 4. c. 85	Indian Salaries and Pensions Act 1825	The whole act.
7 Geo. 4. c. 56	East India Officers' Act 1826	The whole act.
3 & 4 Will. 4. c. 85	Government of India Act 1833	The whole act, except section one hundred and twelve.
5 & 6 Will. 4. c. 52	India (North-West Provinces) Act 1835	The whole act.
7 Will. 4 & 1 Vict. c. 47	India Officers' Salaries Act 1837	The whole act.
5 & 6 Vict. c. 119	Indian Bishops Act 1842	The whole act.
16 & 17 Vict. c. 95	Government of India Act 1853	The whole act.
17 & 18 Vict. c. 77	Government of India Act 1854	The whole act.
21 & 22 Vict. c. 106	Government of India Act 1858	The whole act, except section four.
22 & 23 Vict. c. 41	Government of India Act 1859	The whole act.
23 & 24 Vict. c. 100	European Forces (India) Act 1860	The whole act.
23 & 24 Vict. c. 102	East India Stock Act 1860	The whole act, except section six.
24 & 25 Vict. c. 54	Indian Civil Service Act 1861	The whole act.
24 & 25 Vict. c. 67	Indian Councils Act 1861	The whole act.
24 & 25 Vict. c. 104	Indian High Courts Act 1861	The whole act.
28 & 29 Vict. c. 15	Indian High Courts Act 1865	The whole act.
28 & 29 Vict. c. 17	Government of India Act 1865	The whole act.
32 & 33 Vict. c. 97	Government of India Act 1869	The whole act.
32 & 33 Vict. c. 98	Indian Councils Act 1869	The whole act.
33 & 34 Vict. c. 3	Government of India Act 1870	The whole act.
33 & 34 Vict. c. 59	East India Contracts Act 1870	The whole act.
34 & 35 Vict. c. 34	Indian Councils Act 1871	The whole act.
34 & 35 Vict. c. 62	Indian Bishops Act 1871	The whole act.
37 & 38 Vict. c. 3	East India Loan Act 1874	Section fifteen.
37 & 38 Vict. c. 77	Colonial Clergy Act 1874	Section thirteen.
37 & 38 Vict. c. 91	Indian Councils Act 1874	The whole act.
43 Vict. c. 3	Indian Salaries and Allowances Act 1880	The whole act.
44 & 45 Vict. c. 63	India Office Auditor Act 1881	The whole act.
47 & 48 Vict. c. 38	Indian Marine Service Act 1884	Sections two, three, four and five.
55 & 56 Vict. c. 14	Indian Councils Act 1892	The whole act.
3 Edw. 7. c. 11	Contracts (India Office) Act 1903	The whole act.
4 Edw. 7. c. 26	Indian Councils Act 1904	The whole act.
7 Edw. 7. c. 35	Council of India Act 1907	The whole act.
9 Edw. 7. c. 4	Indian Councils Act 1909	The whole act.
1 & 2 Geo. 5. c. 18	Indian High Courts Act 1911	The whole act.
1 & 2 Geo. 5. c. 25	Government of India Act Amendment Act 1911	The whole act.
2 & 3 Geo. 5. c. 6	Government of India Act 1912	The whole act.

== Subsequent developments ==
The whole act was repealed by section 321 of, and the tenth schedule to, the Government of India Act 1935 (25 & 26 Geo. 5. c. 42), which came into force on 1 April 1937.
