= Charter Act 1813 =

Act of the Parliament of the United Kingdom

East India Company Act 1813 (Note: The citation of this act by this short title was authorised by section 1 of, and the first schedule to, the Short Titles Act 1896. Due to the repeal of those provisions it is now authorised by section 19(2) of the Interpretation Act 1978.)
- Act of Parliament
- Parliament of the United Kingdom
- Long title: An Act for continuing in the East India Company, for a further Term, the Possession of the British Territories in India, together with certain exclusive Privileges; for establishing further Regulations for the Government of the said Territories, and the better Administration of Justice within the same; and for regulating the Trade to and from the Places within the Limits of the said Company's Charter.
- Citation: 53 Geo. 3. c. 155
- Territorial extent: United Kingdom

Dates
- Royal assent: 22 July 1813
- Commencement: 22 July 1813 (Note: The Acts of Parliament (Commencement) Act 1793.)
- Repealed: 1 January 1916
Other legislation
Amended by	Lascars Act 1823; East India Company's Service Act 1823; East India Officers' Act 1826; Statute Law Revision Act 1878; Statute Law Revision Act 1888; Statute Law Revision Act 1890
Repealed by	Government of India Act 1915
Relates to	East India Company Act 1793

Status: Repealed

Text of statute as originally enacted

The East India Company Act 1813 (53 Geo. 3. c. 155), also known as the Charter Act 1813, was an act of the Parliament of the United Kingdom that renewed the charter issued to the British East India Company, and continued the Company's rule in India. However, the Company's commercial monopoly was ended, except for the tea and opium trade and the trade with China, this reflecting the growth of British power in India. Napoleon’s Berlin Decree of 1806 and the Milan Decree of 1807 established the Continental System across Europe as it barred the import of British goods into Europe. Due to these restrictions, the British traders pressed for the dissolution of the East India Company’s trade monopoly and sought greater access to Asian markets, which was the circumstance leading to the passing of this Act. India was made into a source of raw materials as well as a market for Britain’s finished products, through the economic and cultural changes brought about by this Act.

== Contents ==
The act expressly asserted the Crown's sovereignty over British India, allotted 100,000 rupees annually for the improvement of literary and scientific knowledge, and allowed the Bishop of Calcutta authority over the Anglican Church in India. The power of the provincial governments and courts in India over European British subjects was also strengthened by the act, and financial provision was also made to encourage a revival in Indian literature and for the promotion of science.

The act, renewing the East India Company's commercial and administrative authority in India, marked a significant moment in the evolution of British colonial policy. While it did not introduce specific educational reforms, the charter's renewal intensified debates about the Company's responsibilities toward Indian subjects, setting the stage for the act's explicit educational provisions. These discussions, shaped by figures like Charles Grant and evangelical groups such as the Clapham Evangelical Movement, highlighted the potential of cultural and educational interventions to strengthen British governance. The charter maintained religious neutrality, reflecting a cautious approach to cultural assimilation that influenced subsequent policies.

=== Key outcomes ===
The act, while primarily focused on renewing the East India Company's trade monopoly, indirectly catalyzed positive developments in colonial governance by sparking debates that reshaped British policy in India. One key outcome was the increased attention to the Company's moral and administrative obligations, prompted by parliamentary and evangelical scrutiny in Britain. These discussions encouraged British officials to consider education as a tool for fostering cultural alignment with British values, laying the groundwork for the 1813 Charter's allocation of 100,000 rupees annually for Indian education. This shift promised long-term benefits, such as the promotion of English literary studies, which aimed to create a class of Indian intermediaries who could facilitate colonial administration through shared cultural values. The charter's renewal also strengthened parliamentary oversight of the Company, enhancing accountability and encouraging policies that addressed Indian welfare, albeit within a colonial framework. By maintaining religious neutrality, the charter avoided alienating India's diverse religious communities, fostering stability that enabled later educational reforms to proceed without significant resistance. By promoting Missionary activity, the British Parliament was afraid that it might increase resistance to governance as the revolt of 1806 in Vellore was attributed to proselytizing activities.

=== Missionary activity and its influence ===
The act played a pivotal role in debates over missionary activity in India, reflecting tensions between evangelical aspirations and the East India Company's pragmatic governance. Evangelical groups, notably the Clapham Sect, pushed for missionary efforts to spread Christianity and Western moral values Charles Grant, a prominent Company official and evangelical, argued that education, rather than direct proselytization, could achieve cultural influence while respecting the Company's policy of religious neutrality. The charter's renewal did not authorize missionary activities, as the Company feared provoking unrest among Indian communities sensitive to religious interference. Instead, it indirectly shaped a secular approach to education, where English literature was promoted as a "neutral" vehicle for imparting British values, sidestepping overt religious conversion. Viswanathan highlights that this compromise emerged from evangelical pressures but aligned with the Company's need to maintain control, illustrating how missionary advocacy influenced the trajectory of colonial education policy without directly altering the 1813 Charter's provisions.

The Company's charter had previously been renewed by the East India Company Act 1793 (33 Geo. 3. c. 52), and was next renewed by the Government of India Act 1833 (3 & 4 Will. 4. c. 85).

It effectively turned Indians into consumers of British machine-made goods and led to the decline of indigenous Indian industries, particularly textiles.

A paper by Clingingsmith and Williamson challenges the traditional "nationalist critique" of colonial economic policy regarding Indian deindustrialization. Based on new relative price evidence, they argue that local factors like the decline of the Mughal Empire and climate shocks affecting grain prices played a more significant role in the timing and pace of deindustrialization than British "free trade" policy alone.

== Key Mechanisms and Impacts of Deindustrialization (Pre-1813 and Post-1813) ==
Based on the Clingingsmith and Williamson (2004) paper, the textile deindustrialization had distinct phases:

== Primary Mechanisms of Deindustrialization ==
=== Mughal Decline Phase (c.1750-1810) ===
- Collapse of the Mughal empire created political instability and weakened central administration, which severely damaged agricultural productivity through increased revenue farming and higher effective rent burdens on peasants.
- Grain prices soared dramatically as agricultural productivity declined, rising by 30 percent or more during the 1740s and 1750s.
- Nominal wages in manufacturing rose substantially to maintain subsistence levels as food prices increased, causing the manufacturing wage to more than double between 1765 and 1810, which eroded India's cost competitiveness in world textile markets.
- India's share of key Atlantic economy markets declined significantly before factory production emerged - from 38 percent in West African trade during the 1730s to 22 percent in the 1780s, and in European markets from over 20 percent in the 1720s to about 6 percent in the 1780s.
- English defensive legislation between 1701 and 1722 barred Indian textiles from the English domestic market while keeping the Atlantic economy as a competitive zone.

=== Post-1813 Globalization Phase (c.1810-1860) ===
- Rapid factory-based productivity growth in Britain drove down global textile prices dramatically - Britain's terms of trade fell 40 percent between 1801-1810 and 1841-1850, meaning manufactured export prices dropped sharply relative to raw material imports.
- After 1813, British factory-made textiles invaded the Indian domestic market, a market that India had supplied for centuries, taking away the local market that handloom producers had previously dominated.
- Transport revolution and declining trade barriers further lowered the relative price of manufactures in India while raising export commodity prices, creating "Dutch disease" effects where import-competing manufacturing slumped while export sectors boomed.
- Financial transfers from India to Britain totaled significant sums (peaking at over £1 million annually in 1784-1792) but represented less than 2 percent of either economy's industrial output, making them a minor factor compared to other forces.

=== Employment and Output Impacts ===
- India's share of world industrial output collapsed from approximately 25 percent in 1750 to only 2 percent by 1900.
- The manufacturing workforce share likely declined from 15-18 percent in 1800 to about 10 percent by 1900.
- In Gangetic Bihar, the population dependent on industrial employment fell from approximately 19-29 percent in 1809-1813 to just 8.5 percent by 1901, with cotton spinning accounting for the vast majority of this decline.
- Available cotton yarn for handloom production plummeted from 419 million pounds in 1850 to 240 million in 1870 and 221 million by 1900, indicating near-complete collapse of hand spinning followed by steep decline in hand weaving.
- India transformed from supplying all domestic textile needs and maintaining flourishing exports at the century's start to absorbing over 40 percent of total British cloth exports by 1900.

=== Living Standards and Wage Effects ===
- Real wages measured against grain prices fell approximately 51 percent for unskilled labor between 1600 and 1938, with 48 percentage points of this decline occurring by 1850.
- While mid-18th century South Indian real wages were comparable to those in southern England, a substantial living standard gap opened during the late 18th and 19th centuries.

=== Comparative Perspective ===
- India's terms of trade improvement was modest compared to other peripheral regions - rising only 28.6 percent between 1800-1804 and 1855-1859 (under 0.5 percent annually), while Egypt's rose 2.7 percent annually, the Ottoman Empire's 2.4 percent annually, and Latin America's 1.7 percent annually
- India's world manufacturing output share fell 6.9 percentage points between 1750-1830, substantially more than China (3 percentage points) or the rest of the periphery (2.6 percentage points), suggesting domestic supply-side factors like Mughal decline played a uniquely important role.

The result was the widespread decline of traditional Indian crafts and industries, causing economic distress, ruralization/de-urbanization and forcing many artisans to abandon their ancestral professions turning to agriculture and pay heavy taxes that, in the absence of protection by law, led to their exploitation by unscrupulous moneylenders and in many cases, loss of land and poverty. This transformation solidified India's role as an economic colony of industrial England and reinforced social ills that accompany poverty.

== Significance ==
The Charter Act 1813 is significant in the constitutional and educational history of British India:

- It ended the East India Company's trade monopoly over India, except for trade in tea and trade with China, thereby opening Indian markets to private British merchants.
- For the first time, the British Parliament explicitly asserted the sovereignty of the Crown over British India, making the Company a mere administrative agent of the Crown.
- It allocated a sum of rupees one lakh annually for the revival and promotion of literature and the encouragement of the learned natives of India — laying the foundation for modern education in India.
- Christian missionaries were permitted to enter India and carry out educational and missionary activities, which had significant long-term cultural and social consequences.
- It required the Company to maintain separate ecclesiastical establishments in India, marking the beginning of official British support for the Church in India.
- The act strengthened parliamentary control over the Company by requiring the Board of Control to submit detailed financial statements to Parliament.

== Limitations ==
The act had several significant drawbacks:

- The Company retained its monopoly over the highly profitable China trade and tea trade, limiting the extent of free trade.
- The provision for promoting Indian education was minimal — only one lakh rupees annually — and remained largely unspent for years due to disagreements over the medium of instruction.
- The act made no provision for Indian representation in governance, leaving the Indian population entirely excluded from legislative and administrative processes.
- The jurisdictional conflicts between the Supreme Court and the Company's courts remained unresolved, continuing to create legal confusion.
- The act did not address the growing problem of Indian debt and the financial instability of the Company's administration.

== Subsequent developments ==
The whole act was repealed by section 130 of, and the fourth schedule to, the Government of India Act 1915 (5 & 6 Geo. 5. c. 61), which came into force on 1 January 1916.

== See also ==
- East India Company Act
- Regulating Act 1773
- East India Company Act 1784
- Charter Act 1793
- Government of India Act 1833
- Government of India Act 1858

== Bibliography ==
- East India Company Act 1813. Printed by George Eyre and Andrew Strahan, Printers to the King's most Excellent Majesty. London. 1813.
- The Statutes: Second Revised Edition. 1889. Volume 3. Pages 811 to 820.
- The Statutes: Revised Edition. 1877. Volume 5. Pages 278 to 287.
- Andrew Lyon. A Guide to the Law of India. 1872. Pages 20, 67, 92 and 103. 1873. Volume 2. Pages 108, 112 and 295 to 298.
- The Law Relating to India, and the East-India Company. Fourth Edition. Wm H Allen & Co. London. 1842. Pages 167 to 199.
