= Statute Law Revision Act 1878 =

Act of the Parliament of the United Kingdom

Statute Law Revision Act 1878 (Note: Section 4.)
- Act of Parliament
- Parliament of the United Kingdom
- Long title: An Act for further promoting the Revision of the Statute Law by repealing certain Enactments which have ceased to be in force or have become unnecessary.
- Citation: 41 & 42 Vict. c. 79
- Introduced by: Hugh Cairns, 1st Earl Cairns (Lords)
- Territorial extent: United Kingdom

Dates
- Royal assent: 16 August 1878
- Commencement: 16 August 1878 (Note: The Acts of Parliament (Commencement) Act 1793.)
- Repealed: 19 November 1998
Other legislation
Amends	Statute Law Revision Act 1873; Statute Law Revision Act 1875; § Repealed enactments
Repeals/revokes	See § Repealed enactments
Amended by	Statute Law Revision Act 1894
Repealed by	Statute Law (Repeals) Act 1998
Relates to	Repeal of Obsolete Statutes Act 1856; See Statute Law Revision Act

Status: Repealed

History of passage through Parliament

Records of Parliamentary debate relating to the statute from Hansard

Text of statute as originally enacted

The Statute Law Revision Act 1878 (41 & 42 Vict. c. 79) was an act of the Parliament of the United Kingdom that repealed for the United Kingdom enactments from 1707 to 1868 which had ceased to be in force or had become necessary. The act was intended, in particular, to facilitate the preparation of the revised edition of the statutes, then in progress.

== Background ==
In the United Kingdom, acts of Parliament remain in force until expressly repealed. Blackstone's Commentaries on the Laws of England, published in the late 18th-century, raised questions about the system and structure of the common law and the poor drafting and disorder of the existing statute book.

From 1810 to 1825, The Statutes of the Realm was published, providing the first authoritative collection of acts. The first statute law revision act was not passed until 1856 with the Repeal of Obsolete Statutes Act 1856 (19 & 20 Vict. c. 64). This approach — focusing on removing obsolete laws from the statute book followed by consolidation — was proposed by Peter Locke King MP, who had been highly critical of previous commissions' approaches, expenditures, and lack of results.

Previous Acts
Year passed	Title	Citation	Effect
1861	Statute Law Revision Act 1861	24 & 25 Vict. c. 101	Repealed or amended over 800 enactments
1863	Statute Law Revision Act 1863	26 & 27 Vict. c. 125	Repealed or amended over 1,600 enactments for England and Wales
1867	Statute Law Revision Act 1867	30 & 31 Vict. c. 59	Repealed or amended over 1,380 enactments
1870	Statute Law Revision Act 1870	33 & 34 Vict. c. 69	Repealed or amended over 250 enactments
1871	Promissory Oaths Act 1871	34 & 35 Vict. c. 48	Repealed or amended almost 200 enactments
1871	Statute Law Revision Act 1871	34 & 35 Vict. c. 116	Repealed or amended over 1,060 enactments
1872	Statute Law Revision Act 1872	35 & 36 Vict. c. 63	Repealed or amended almost 490 enactments
1872	Statute Law (Ireland) Revision Act 1872	35 & 36 Vict. c. 98	Repealed or amended over 1,050 enactments
1872	Statute Law Revision Act 1872 (No. 2)	35 & 36 Vict. c. 97	Repealed or amended almost 260 enactments
1873	Statute Law Revision Act 1873	36 & 37 Vict. c. 91	Repealed or amended 1,225 enactments
1874	Statute Law Revision Act 1874	37 & 38 Vict. c. 35	Repealed or amended over 490 enactments
1874	Statute Law Revision Act 1874 (No. 2)	37 & 38 Vict. c. 96	Repealed or amended almost 470 enactments
1875	Statute Law Revision Act 1875	38 & 39 Vict. c. 66	Repealed or amended over 1,400 enactments
1876	Statute Law Revision (Substituted Enactments) Act 1876	39 & 40 Vict. c. 20	Updated references to repealed acts
1878	Statute Law Revision (Ireland) Act 1878	41 & 42 Vict. c. 57	Repealed or amended over 460 enactments passed by the Parliament of Ireland

== Passage ==
The bill had its first reading in the House of Lords on 17 June 1878, introduced by the Lord Chancellor, Hugh Cairns, 1st Earl Cairns. The bill had its second reading in the House of Lords on 8 July 1878 and was committed to a committee of the whole house, which met and reported on 9 July 1878, with amendments. The bill had its third reading in the House of Lords on 9 and passed, without amendments.

The bill had its first reading in the House of Commons on 13 July 1878. The bill had its second reading in the House of Commons on 15 July 1878 and was committed to a committee of the whole house, which met on 7 August 1877 and reported on 8 August 1878, with amendments. The amended bill had its third reading in the House of Commons on 9 August 1878 and passed, without amendments.

The amended bill was considered and agreed to by the House of Lords on 14 August 1877.

The bill was granted royal assent on 16 August 1877.

== Subsequent developments ==
The act was intended, in particular, to facilitate the preparation of a revised edition of the statutes.

Sections 2 and 3 of, and the schedules to, the act, were repealed by section 1 of, and the first schedule to, the Statute Law Revision Act 1894 (57 & 58 Vict. c. 54), which came into force on 25 August 1894.

The whole act was repealed by section 1(1) of, and group 1 of part IX of schedule 1 to, the Statute Law (Repeals) Act 1998, which came into force on 19 November 1998.

The act was retained for the Republic of Ireland by section 2(2)(a) of, and part 4 of schedule 1 to, the Statute Law Revision Act 2007, which came into force on 8 May 2007.

== Repealed enactments ==
Section 1 of the act repealed 93 enactments, listed in the schedule to the act, across six categories: (Note: The Note of the bill, unlike the schedule, gives commentary on each act, noting any earlier repeals and the reason for the new repeal.)

- Expired
- Spent
- Repealed in general terms
- Virtually repealed
- Superseded
- Obsolete

Section 1 of the act included several safeguards to ensure that the repeal does not negatively affect existing rights or ongoing legal matters. Specifically, any legal rights, privileges, or remedies already obtained under the repealed laws, as well as any legal proceedings or principles established by them, remain unaffected. Section 1 of the act also ensured that repealed enactments that have been incorporated into other laws would continue to have legal effect in those contexts. Moreover, the repeal would not revive any former rights, offices, or jurisdictions that had already been abolished.

Section 2 of the act revived 5 acts repealed by the Statute Law Revision Act 1873 (36 & 37 Vict. c. 91) and the Statute Law Revision Act 1875 (38 & 39 Vict. c. 66).

Section 3 of the act replaced the text "The Schedule" in the partial repeal of the Industrial Schools Act 1866 (29 & 30 Vict.) for "The First Schedule".

Revived Acts
Citation	Short title	Title	Extent of revival
9 Geo. 4. c. 58	Licensing (Scotland) Act 1828	An Act the title of which begins with the words—An Act to regulate the granting of certificates—and ends with the words—prevention of such houses being kept without such certificate.	Section Two. Section Three, from "Provided always," to the end of that Section. Section Four, from "Provided always," to the end of that Section. Section Eighteen. Section Twenty-three, from "and all such" to the end of that Section. So much of the form in the Schedule, designated by the letter A., as prescribes the form of deliverance at the end of each day's register. So much of the form in the Schedule, designated by the letter D., as prescribes the form of a warrant of imprisonment, and the note to that form.
10 Geo. 4. c. 44	Metropolitan Police Act 1829	An Act for improving the Police in and near the Metropolis	Section nine.
8 & 9 Vict. c. 100	Lunacy Act 1845	An Act for the Regulation of the Care and Treatment of Lunatics.	So much of Sections ninety-nine and One hundred and five as was repealed by the Statute Law Revision Act, 1875.
9 & 10 Vict. c. 115	Lunatic Asylums (Ireland) Act 1846	An Act the title of which begins with the words,—An Act to amend the Laws as to District Lunatic Asylums in Ireland,—and ends with the words,—Salaries and Expenses incident to the Office of Inspector of Lunatics in Ireland.	Section Two, except so much thereof as was repealed by 18 & 19 Vict. c. 109. s. 4. Section Three.
16 & 17 Vict. c. 67	Licensing (Scotland) Act 1853	An Act for the better Regulation of Public Houses in Scotland.	Section eleven, to "continued in the said Schedule". Section twelve. So much of the Schedule as prescribes the form of register of applications.

Repealed Acts
Citation	Short title	Title	Extent of repeal
6 Anne c. 41 (Note: Chap 7 in the ordinary editions.)	Succession to the Crown Act 1707	An Act for the Security of Her Majesties Person and Government and of the Succession to the Crown of Great Britain in the Protestant Line.	Section Four, from "for and during" to "above-mentioned," and from "and continue" to the end of that Section. Section Five, from "for and during" to the end of that Section.
6 Anne c. 53 (Note: Chapter 26 in the ordinary editions.)	Exchequer Court (Scotland) Act 1707	An Act for settling and establishing a Court of Exchequer in the North Part of Great Britain called Scotland.	Section Twenty-six. (Note: Sect. 18 in the ordinary editions.)
53 Geo. 3 c. 155	East India Company Act 1813	An Act the title of which begins with the words—for continuing in the East India Company—and ends with the words—within the Limits of the said Company's Charter.	Section Eighty-nine, so far as it relates to the governor of Prince of Wales Island and the recorder there. Repealed as to all Her Majesty's Dominions.
6 Geo. 4 c. 85	Indian Salaries and Pensions Act 1825	An Act the title of which begins with the words—An Act for further regulating the Payment of the Salaries and Pensions to the Judges of His Majesty's Courts in India—and ends with the words—Colonies on the Coast of Coromandel.	Section Thirteen and Fourteen wholly, and Sections Five, Seven, and Sixteen, so far as they relate to the recorder of the Court of Judicature of Prince of Wales Island. Repealed as to all Her Majesty's Dominions.
7 Geo. 4 c. 16	Chelsea and Kilmainham Hospitals Act 1826	An Act to consolidate and amend several Acts relating to the Royal Hospitals for Soldiers at Chelsea and Kilmainham.	Section Three, the word "whether", and the words "or elsewhere."
9 Geo. 4 c. 58	Licensing (Scotland) Act 1828	An Act the title of which begins with the words—An Act to regulate the granting of Certificates—and ends with the words—Prevention of such Houses being kept without such Certificate.	Section Thirty-two.
6 & 7 Will. 4 c. 13	Constabulary (Ireland) Act 1836	An Act to consolidate the Laws relating to the Constabulary Force in Ireland.	Section Twenty-nine, from "it shall be lawful for the Lord Lieutenant" to "for all such clerks the sum of eight hundred pounds; and".
2 & 3 Vict. c. 75	Constabulary (Ireland) Act 1839	An Act for the better Regulation of the Constabulary Force in Ireland.	Section Two, from "and such surgeon shall receive" to the end of that Section.
3 & 4 Vict. c. 61	Beerhouse Act 1840	An Act to amend the Acts relating to the general Sale of Beer and Cider by Retail in England.	Section Eight, the words "and entering into the usual bond".
3 & 4 Vict. c. 96	Post Office (Duties) Act 1840	An Act for the Regulation of the Duties of Postage.	Sections Two, Six, Eight to Ten, Seventeen, Thirty-one, and Thirty-two. Section Thirty-three, except so much thereof as defines letters chargeable with postage. Section Thirty-four. Section Thirty-five, the words "according to the scale of weight and number of rates hereinbefore mentioned". Sections Thirty-nine, Forty-six, Fifty-seven, and Fifty-eight. Section Fifty-nine, from "and that" to the end of that Section. Section Sixty-three. Section Seventy, to "and that". Section Seventy-one, from "the term 'British newspapers'" to "nor liable to stamp duties and". The Schedule. Repealed as to all Her Majesty's Dominions.
5 & 6 Vict. c. 95	Four Courts Marshalsea (Ireland) Act 1842	An Act for consolidating the Four Courts Marshalsea, Dublin Marshalsea, Sheriffs Prison, Dublin, and City Marshalsea, Dublin, and for regulating the Four Courts Marshal sea in Ireland.	Section One, the words "subject to the provisions herein-after contained". Section Nine.
5 & 6 Vict. c. 106	Fisheries (Ireland) Act 1842	An Act to regulate the Irish Fisheries.	Section Two. Section Thirty-three, from "and provided also" to the end of that Section.
6 & 7 Vict. c. 32	Grand Juries (Ireland) Act 1843	An Act to amend the Laws in force relating to Grand Jury Presentments in Counties of Cities and Towns in Ireland.	Sections Fifteen and Twenty-one to Twenty-five.
6 & 7 Vict. c. 93	Municipal Corporations (Ireland) Act 1843	An Act to amend an Act of the Third and Fourth Years of Her present Majesty, for the Regulation of Municipal Corporations in Ireland.	Section Twenty-six, from "and that all and every" to "as by the said Act required".
7 & 8 Vict. c. 49	Post Office (Duties) Act 1844	An Act for the better Regulation of Colonial Posts.	Sections Six and Eight. Repealed as to all Her Majesty's Dominions.
7 & 8 Vict. c. 52	Parish Constables Act 1844	An Act to extend the Powers of the Act for the Appointment and Payment of Parish Constables.	Section Three.
7 & 8 Vict. c. 67	Post Horse Licence Duties (Ireland) Act 1844	An Act to transfer the Collection of the Duty on Licences to let Horses for Hire in Ireland from the Commissioners of Stamps to the Commissioners of Excise.	The whole act.
7 & 8 Vict. c. 81	Marriages (Ireland) Act 1844	An Act for Marriages in Ireland; and for registering such Marriages.	Section Eighty-two.
7 & 8 Vict. c. 83	Savings Bank Act 1844	An Act to amend the Laws relating to Savings Banks, and to the Purchase of Government Annuities through the Medium of Savings Banks.	Sections Two, Six, Eight, Thirteen, Sixteen to Eighteen, Twenty-one, and Twenty-three.
7 & 8 Vict. c. 90	Judgments (Ireland) Act 1844	An Act for the Protection of Purchasers against Judgments, Laws in Ireland respecting Bankrupts and the Limitation of Actions.	Section Thirty-one.
7 & 8 Vict. c. 91	South Wales Turnpike Trusts Act 1844	An Act to consolidate and amend the Laws relating to Turnpike Trusts in South Wales.	Section Seventy, the words "to the said Commissioners, or after the said Commissioners shall have determined", the words "then or" (where they next occur), and the words "or to the said Commissioners".
7 & 8 Vict. c. 107	Common Law Offices (Ireland) Act 1844	An Act to regulate and reduce the Expenses of the Offices attached to the Superior Courts of Law in Ireland payable out of the Consolidated Fund.	Section Six, from "in and by an Act passed in the ninth" to "limited time, or". Section Nineteen, the words "and searching". Section Twenty-three.
8 & 9 Vict. c. 64	Spirits (Ireland) Act 1845	An Act to amend certain Regulations respecting the Retail of Spirits in Ireland.	Section Three.
8 & 9 Vict. c. 81	Grand Jury (Dublin) Act 1845	An Act to amend an Act of the last Session, for consolidating and amending the Laws for the Regulation of Grand Jury Presentments in the County of Dublin.	Section Eight, the words "at the said presenting term", and the word "succeeding".
8 & 9 Vict. c. 100	Lunacy Act 1845	An Act for the Regulation of the Care and Treatment of Lunatics.	Section Thirty-four. Section Thirty-nine, the words "or under any of the Acts herein-before repealed". Section Forty-four, the words "or one of the Acts herein-before repealed". Section Eighty-four, the words "(to be applied as herein-before provided)". Section One hundred and two, from "to be by him" (where those words first occur) to "Commissioners". Section One hundred and six, from "and be by him" (where those words first occur) to "Commissioners". Section One hundred and nine, from "and included" (where those words first occur) to "kept by him" (where those words first occur).
8 & 9 Vict. c. 112	Satisfied Terms Act 1845	An Act to facilitate and encourage the granting of certain Leases for Terms of Years in Ireland.	Section One, from "and any such lease" to the end of that Section. Sections Two and Three.
10 & 11 Vict. c. 85	Post Office (Duties) Act 1847	An Act for giving further Facilities for the Transmission of Letters by Post, and for the regulating the Duties of Postage thereon, and for other Purposes relating to the Post Office.	Section Two. Section Three, except so far as relates to colonial postage. Sections Four, Eight, Nine, and Fifteen. Repealed as to all Her Majesty's Dominions.
11 & 12 Vict. c. 2	Prevention of Crime (Ireland) Act 1848	An Act for the better Prevention of Crime and Outrage in certain Parts of Ireland until the First Day of December One thousand eight hundred and forty-nine, and to the End of the then next Session of Parliament.	The Preamble. Section Fifteen, the words "in the form (A.) in the schedule hereunto annexed contained", and the words "in the form (B.) in the schedule to this Act annexed contained". Section Twenty-one. The Schedule. And so much of the rest of the Act as relates to the posting of proclamations, abstracts, and notices.
11 & 12 Vict. c. 5	Government of New Zealand Act 1848	An Act to suspend for Five Years the Operation of certain Parts of an Act of the Tenth Year of Her present Majesty, for making further Provision for the Government of the New Zealand Islands; and to make other Provision in lieu thereof.	Sections Eight and Nine. Repealed as to all Her Majesty's Dominions.
11 & 12 Vict. c. 21	Indian Insolvency Act 1848	An Act to consolidate and amend the Laws relating to Insolvent Debtors in India.	Sections Eighty-eight to Ninety. Repealed as to all Her Majesty's Dominions.
11 & 12 Vict. c. 28	Execution (Ireland) Act 1848	An Act to amend the Laws of Imprisonment for Debt in Ireland, and to improve the Remedies for the Recovery of Debts and of the Possession of Tenements situate in Cities and Towns, in certain Cases.	Section Fifteen.
11 & 12 Vict. c. 56	Canada Union Act 1848	An Act the title of which begins with the words—An Act to repeal so much of an Act of the Third—and ends with the words—Legislative Assembly of the Province of Canada.	Repealed as to all Her Majesty's Dominions.
11 & 12 Vict. c. 92	Fisheries (Ireland) Act 1848	An Act for the Protection and Improvement of the Salmon, Trout, and other Inland Fisheries of Ireland.	Section Forty-three.
11 & 12 Vict. c. 113	Dublin Police Act 1848	An Act for the further Amendment of the Acts relating to the Dublin Police.	Sections Two and Three.
11 & 12 Vict. c. 133	Savings Banks (Ireland) Act 1848	An Act to amend the Laws relating to Savings Banks in Ireland.	The whole act.
12 & 13 Vict. c. 48	Vancouver's Island Act 1849	An Act to provide for the Administration of Justice in Vancouver's Island.	Section Five. Repealed as to all Her Majesty's Dominions.
12 & 13 Vict. c. 66	Colonial Inland Post Office Act 1849	An Act for enabling Colonial Legislatures to establish Inland Posts.	Section Seven. Repealed as to all Her Majesty's Dominions.
12 & 13 Vict. c. 91	Dublin, Collection of Rates Act 1849	An Act to provide for the Collection of Rates in the City of Dublin.	Section Thirty, the words "on or before the tenth day of December one thousand eight hundred and fifty, and", the word "succeeding" (wherever it occurs), and the words "on or before the said tenth day of December one thousand eight hundred and fifty, and". Section Thirty-one. Section Thirty-two, the words "on or before the tenth day of December one thousand eight hundred and fifty, and", the word "succeeding" (wherever it occurs), the words "on or before the said tenth day of December one thousand eight hundred and fifty, and", and from "Provided always" to the end of that Section. Section Thirty-three. Section Thirty-five, from "Provided also" to the end of that Section. Section Thirty-seven, the words "on or before the tenth day of December one thousand eight hundred and fifty, and", and the word "succeeding". Section Thirty-nine. Section Forty-one, from "on or before" (where those words first occur) to "same year, and", and the word "succeeding". Sections Forty-two, Forty-three, Eighty-eight, Ninety, and Ninety-one.
12 & 13 Vict. c. 92	Cruelty to Animals Act 1849	An Act for the more effectual Prevention of Cruelty to Animals.	Section Eleven, the words "be licensed as a horse dealer, or", and from "and if" to the end of that Section.
12 & 13 Vict. c. 96	Admiralty Offences (Colonial) Act 1849	An Act to provide for the Prosecution and Trial in Her Majesty's Colonies of Offences committed within the jurisdiction of the Admiralty.	Section Six. Repealed as to all Her Majesty's Dominions.
13 & 14 Vict. c. 15	West Indian Courts of Appeal Act 1850	An Act to facilitate the Establishment of Courts of Appeal for certain of Her Majesty's West India Colonies.	Sections Seven and Eight. Repealed as to all Her Majesty's Dominions.
13 & 14 Vict. c. 18	Supreme Court (Ireland) Act 1850	An Act for the Regulation of Process and Practice in the Superior Courts of Common Law in Ireland.	Sections Twenty to Twenty-four, Twenty-six, Twenty-eight, and Twenty-nine. Section Thirty-two, from "and such" to the end of that Section.
13 & 14 Vict. c. 59	Australian Constitutions Act 1850	An Act for the better Government of Her Majesty's Australian Colonies.	Section Thirty-eight. Repealed as to all Her Majesty's Dominions.
13 & 14 Vict. c. 69	Representation of the People (Ireland) Act 1850	An Act to amend the Laws which regulate the Qualification and Registration of Parliamentary Voters in Ireland, and to alter the Law for rating immediate Lessors of Premises to the Poor Rate in certain Boroughs.	Section Twelve, the words "after the said last-mentioned day". Section Twenty-one, the words "after one thousand eight hundred and fifty-one". Section Twenty-five, the words "after one thousand eight hundred and fifty-one". Section Fifty-five, the words "the list of registered voters, or". Section Eighty-five, from "holden" to "fifty-one". Section Ninety-one, from "holden" to "fifty-one". Section One hundred and seventeen, from "the expression 'succeeding year'" to "fifty-one". Schedule (B.), Form No. 4, from "(in the year one thousand eight hundred and fifty-one)" to "and together (in every succeeding year)".
13 & 14 Vict. c. 74	Judgments Registry (Ireland) Act 1850	An Act for the better Regulation of the Office of Registrar of Judgments in Ireland.	Section Five. Section Six, the words "the said duties and".
13 & 14 Vict. c. 89	Court of Chancery (Ireland) Regulation Act 1850	An Act to regulate the Proceedings in the High Court of Chancery in Ireland.	Section Thirty-eight, from "Provided also, that nothing" to the end of that Section. Section Forty-two.
13 & 14 Vict. c. 92	Cruelty to Animals (Scotland) Act 1850	An Act for the more effectual Prevention of Cruelty to Animals in Scotland.	Section Five, the words "be licensed as a horse dealer, or", and from "and if" to the end of that Section.
14 & 15 Vict. c. 38	Turnpike Trusts (Making of Provisional Orders) Act 1851	An Act to facilitate Arrangements for the Relief of Turnpike Trusts, and to make certain Provisions respecting Exemption from Tolls.	Section Four, from "and the word 'constable'" to the end of that Section.
14 & 15 Vict. c. 57	Civil Bill Courts (Ireland) Act 1851	An Act to consolidate and amend the Laws relating to Civil Bills and the Courts of Quarter Sessions in Ireland, and to transfer to the Assistant Barristers certain Jurisdiction as to Insolvent Debtors.	Section Forty-two, from "and shall be entitled," to the end of that Section. Section One hundred and twenty-one, the words "of the said Court for the Relief of Insolvent Debtors, or a Commissioner thereof, or", the words "of the said Court for the Relief of Insolvent Debtors, or", the words "Commissioner or", and the word "Commissioner". Schedule C, the form of sheriff's warrant annexed to form No. 18, the form of sheriff's warrant annexed to form No. 19, and the form of sheriff's warrant annexed to form No. 20. Schedule D, from "Clerk of the peace in cases of Insolvents" to "the fees specified in section 145 of this Act".
14 & 15 Vict. c. 65	Grand Jury Cess (Dublin) Act 1851	An Act to continue certain temporary Provisions for the Purposes of Grand Jury Cess and other Purposes.	Section Two.
14 & 15 Vict. c. 83	Court of Chancery Act 1851	An Act to improve the Administration of Justice in the Court of Chancery and in the Judicial Committee of the Privy Council.	Section Ten.
14 & 15 Vict. c. 85	Constabulary (Ireland) Act 1851	An Act further to amend an Act of the Sixth Year of King William the Fourth, to consolidate and amend the Laws relating to the Constabulary Force in Ireland.	Section Five.
16 & 17 Vict. c. 5	Patent Law Act 1853	An Act to substitute Stamp Duties for Fees on passing Letters Patent for Inventions, and to provide for the Purchase for the Public Use of certain Indexes of Specifications.	Section One. Section Two, the words "(except in the cases provided for in the fourth section of this Act)". Sections Four and Seven. Section Eight, from "for a sum not exceeding" to "receipt of the Exchequer".
16 & 17 Vict. c. 34	Income Tax Act 1853	An Act for granting to Her Majesty Duties on Profits arising from Property, Professions, Trades, and Offices.	Section Twenty-eight, to "less than one hundred pounds a year respectively".
16 & 17 Vict. c. 41	Common Lodging Houses Act 1853	An Act for making further Provisions with respect to Common Lodging Houses.	Sections Nine, Thirteen, and Fourteen.
16 & 17 Vict. c. 67	Licensing (Scotland) Act 1853	An Act for the better Regulation of Public Houses in Scotland.	Section Seventeen, from "The expression 'inn and hotel'" to "travellers".
16 & 17 Vict. c. 70	Lunacy Regulation Act 1853	An Act for the Regulation of Proceedings under Commissions of Lunacy, and the Consolidation and Amendment of the Acts respecting Lunatics so found by Inquisition, and their Estates.	Sections Twenty-two and Twenty-three. Section Twenty-four, from "the secretary" to "the direction of the visitors)".
16 & 17 Vict. c. 89	Universities (Scotland) Act 1853	An Act to regulate the Admission of Professors to the Lay Chairs in the Universities of Scotland.	Section Three.
16 & 17 Vict. c. 95	Care and Treatment of Lunatics Act 1853	An Act to provide for the Government of India.	Sections Two to Fourteen, Twenty, Twenty-one, Twenty-five, Twenty-nine to Thirty-one, Thirty-three, and Thirty-four. Section Thirty-five from "to each ordinary" to "any other office) fifty thousand Company's rupees", and from "Provided always," to the end of that Section. Sections Thirty-six to Forty-three. Repealed as to all Her Majesty's Dominions.
16 & 17 Vict. c. 115	Patent Law (No. 2) Act 1853	An Act the title of which begins with the words—An Act to amend certain Provisions of the Patent Law Amendment Act, 1852,—and ends with the words—and otherwise to amend the said Act.	Section One. Section Six, the words "whether such expiration has happened before or shall happen after the passing of this Act", the words "whether the default in such filing has happened before or shall happen after the passing of this Act", and the words "except in any case that may have arisen before the passing of this Act". Section Seven.
17 & 18 Vict. c. 77	Government of India Act 1854	An Act to provide for the Mode of passing Letters Patent and other Acts of the Crown relating to India, and for vesting certain Powers in the Governor General of India in Council.	Section One, from "and every such warrant or writing as aforesaid" to the end of that Section. Sections Two and Six. Repealed as to all Her Majesty's Dominions.
17 & 18 Vict. c. 102	Corrupt Practices Prevention Act 1854	An Act to consolidate and amend the Laws relating to Bribery, Treating, and undue Influence at Elections of Members of Parliament.	Section Three.
17 & 18 Vict. c. 104	Merchant Shipping Act 1854	An Act to amend and consolidate the Acts relating to Merchant Shipping.	Section Four hundred and thirty-six, from "and may pay" to the end of that Section.
18 & 19 Vict. c. 53	Haileybury College Act 1855	An Act to relieve the East India Company from the Obligation to maintain the College at Haileybury.	The whole act. Repealed as to all Her Majesty's Dominions.
18 & 19 Vict. c. 93	Courts in Prince of Wales Island and India Act 1855	An Act to amend certain Acts relating to the Court of Judicature of Prince of Wales Island, Singapore, and Malacca, and to the Supreme Courts of Judicature in India.	Sections One to Four. Repealed as to all Her Majesty's Dominions.
18 & 19 Vict. c. 116	Diseases Prevention Act 1855	An Act for the better Prevention of Diseases.	Section Thirteen.
18 & 19 Vict. c. 134	Court of Chancery Act 1855	An Act the title of which begins—An Act to make further Provision for the more speedy and efficient Despatch—and ends with the words—Powers of leasing and Sale thereof.	Section Two, so far as it preserves the Provisions of sections XXIV. and XLIV. of the Act 15 & 16 Vict. c. 50.
21 & 22 Vict. c. 97	Public Health Act 1858	An Act for vesting in the Privy Council certain Powers for the Protection of the Public Health.	Section Four, from "and the person" to "as aforesaid".
21 & 22 Vict. c. 106	Government of India Act 1858	An Act for the better Government of India.	Sections Five, Eight, and Seventeen. Section Twenty-nine, the words "fourth ordinary member of the Council of the Governor General of India", and from "the appointments of the ordinary members" to "majority of members present at a meeting". Section Thirty-one. Section Forty-two, to "the redemption thereof, and", and from "Provided always" to the end of that Section. Sections Forty-four and Forty-six. Section Fifty-one, from "that where a warrant" to "shall be made; and". Section Sixty, from "and all appointments" to "by Her Majesty", and from "and the yearly" to the end of that Section. Sections Sixty-six, Sixty-nine, and Seventy. Section Seventy-one, the words "except claims of mortgages of the Security Fund herein-before mentioned". Sections Seventy-two, Seventy-three, and Seventy-five. Repealed as to all Her Majesty's Dominions.
22 & 23 Vict. c. 22	Constabulary (Ireland) Act 1859	An Act to amend the Acts relating to the Constabulary Force in Ireland.	Section Two, the words "not exceeding one thousand pounds". Section Three, the words "not exceeding the amount herein-after mentioned". Section Five.
23 & 24 Vict. c. 110	Customs Duties Consolidation Act 1860	An Act to consolidate the Duties of Customs.	The whole act.
24 & 25 Vict. c. 14	Post Office Savings Bank Act 1861	An Act to grant additional Facilities for depositing small Savings at Interest, with the security of the Government for the Repayment thereof.	Section Nine, the words "not later than the thirty-first of March in every year".
24 & 25 Vict. c. 21	Revenue (No. 1) Act 1861	An Act for granting to Her Majesty certain Duties of Excise and Stamps.	Section Three, from "or that the person applying" to the end of that Section.
24 & 25 Vict. c. 45	General Pier and Harbour Act 1861	An Act to facilitate the Formation, Management, and Maintenance of Piers and Harbours in Great Britain and Ireland.	Section Eighteen, the words "or of the Lords of the Admiralty", and from "or by the Secretary" to the end of that Section.
24 & 25 Vict. c. 67	Indian Councils Act 1861	An Act the title of which begins with the words—An Act to make better Provision for the Constitution of the Council of the Governor General of India—and ends with the words—and for the Vacancy in the Office of Governor General.	Section Three, from "by the Secretary of State" to "meeting". Section Fifty-four. Repealed as to all Her Majesty's Dominions.
24 & 25 Vict. c. 104	Indian High Courts Act 1861	An Act for establishing High Courts of Judicature in India.	Section Three. Section Five, from "and such of the other judges" to "not transferred from the Supreme Court". Section Six, to "except as aforesaid". Repealed as to all Her Majesty's Dominions.
24 & 25 Vict. c. 112	Birkenhead Enfranchisement Act 1861	An Act for the Appropriation of the Seats vacated by the Disfranchisement of the Boroughs of Sudbury and Saint Alban.	Section Ten.
25 & 26 Vict. c. 63	Merchant Shipping Act Amendment Act 1862	An Act to amend the Merchant Shipping Act, 1854, the Merchant Shipping Act Amendment Act, 1855, and the Customs Consolidation Act, 1853.	Section Twenty-three, Sub-section (5).
26 & 27 Vict. c. 12	Secretary at War Abolition Act 1863	An Act to abolish the Office of Secretary at War, and to transfer the Duties of that Office to One of Her Majesty's Principal Secretaries of State.	So much of the Schedule as relates to the Acts 53 Geo. 3. c. 81. (Note: Excise Officers Allowance Act 1812) and 22 & 23 Vict. c. 38. (Note: Militia Act 1859)
26 & 27 Vict. c. 88	Drainage and Improvement of Lands Act (Ireland) 1863	An Act to enable Landed Proprietors to construct Works for the Drainage and Improvement of Lands in Ireland.	Section Thirty-eight, from "Provided always," to the end of that Section.
26 & 27 Vict. c. 89	Poor Removal Act 1863	An Act for the further Amendment of the Law relating to the Removal of poor Persons, Natives of Ireland, from England.	Section One.
26 & 27 Vict. c. 102	Reduction of Duty on Rum Act 1863	An Act to reduce the Duty on Rum in certain Cases.	The whole act.
27 & 28 Vict. c. 92	Public Schools Act 1864	An Act for annexing Conditions to the Appointment of Persons to Offices in the Governing Bodies of certain Public Schools and Colleges.	The whole act.
28 & 29 Vict. c. 5	British Kaffraria Act 1865	An Act for the Incorporation of the Territories of British Kaffraria with the Colony of the Cape of Good Hope.	Sections Four to Eighteen, and the Schedule. Repealed as to all Her Majesty's Dominions.
28 & 29 Vict. c. 15	Indian High Courts Act 1865	An Act to extend the Term for granting fresh Letters Patent for the High Courts in India, and to make further Provision respecting the Territorial Jurisdiction of the said Courts.	Sections Two and Five. Repealed as to all Her Majesty's Dominions.
28 & 29 Vict. c. 17	Government of India Act 1865	An Act to enlarge the Powers of the Governor General of India Lieutenant Governorships in India.	Section Three. Repealed as to all Her Majesty's Dominions.
29 & 30 Vict. c. 36	Revenue Act 1866	An Act to grant, alter, and repeal certain Duties of Customs and Inland Revenue, and for other Purposes relating thereto.	Except Sections Eight and Nine.
29 & 30 Vict. c. 67	British Columbia Act 1866	An Act for the Union of the Colony of Vancouver Island with the Colony of British Columbia.	Section Nine, and the Schedule. Repealed as to all Her Majesty's Dominions.
29 & 30 Vict. c. 103	Constabulary (Ireland) Act 1866	An Act to amend and to consolidate the Laws relating to the Constabulary Force in Ireland.	Section Two, from "1. To each county inspector" to "one hundred and fifty pounds;" from "6. To each head constable major" to "forty-two pounds eighteen shillings;" from "to take head constables" to "twenty pounds," and from "to five county inspectors" to "sixty-six pounds per annum each;" and from "such inspector" to "sixty-six". Section Eight, from "from and after the passing" to "such salaries, and". Section Eleven.
30 & 31 Vict. c. 36	Chester Courts Act 1867	An Act to authorise the Quarter Sessions of the Peace for the Borough and City of Chester Sheriff of the City of Chester.	Except Section Four.
30 & 31 Vict. c. 105	Councils of Conciliation Act 1867	An Act to establish Equitable Councils of Conciliation to adjust Differences between Masters and Workmen.	The Schedule.
30 & 31 Vict. c. 122	Courts of Law Fees Act 1867	An Act for the Application of surplus Fees Courts of Justice, and for other purposes.	The Fifth Schedule.
31 & 32 Vict. c. 36	Alkali Act 1868	An Act to make perpetual the Alkali Act, 1863.	The whole act. (Note: The act was re-repealed by section 30 of the Alkali, &c. Works Regulation Act 1881 (44 & 45 Vict. c. 37).)

== See also ==
- Statute Law Revision Act
