= Regulating Act 1773 =

Act of the Parliament of Great Britain

East India Company Act 1772 (Note: The citation of this act by this short title was authorised by section 1 of, and the first schedule to, the Short Titles Act 1896. Due to the repeal of those provisions it is now authorised by section 19(2) of the Interpretation Act 1978. The modern convention for the citation of short titles omits the comma after the word "Act".)
- Act of Parliament
- Parliament of Great Britain
- Long title: An Act for establishing certain Regulations for the better Management of the Affairs of the East India Company, as well in India as in Europe.
- Citation: 13 Geo. 3. c. 63
- Introduced by: Frederick North, Lord North on 18 May 1773
- Territorial extent: Great Britain; Bengal Presidency; Madras Presidency; Bombay Presidency

Dates
- Royal assent: 21 June 1773
- Commencement: 10 June 1773 1:00pm (Note: Section 1.)
- Repealed: 23 August 1916
Other legislation
Amended by	East India Company Act 1784; Statute Law Revision Act 1887; Statute Law Revision Act 1888; Government of India Act 1915
Repealed by	Government of India (Amendment) Act 1916
Relates to	Tea Act 1773; East India Company (No. 4) Act 1772; East India Company Act 1793

Status: Repealed

Text of statute as originally enacted

The East India Company Act 1772 (13 Geo. 3. c. 63), also known as the Regulating Act 1773, was an act of the Parliament of Great Britain intended to overhaul the management of the East India Company's affairs in India (Bengal). The act did not prove to be a long-term solution to concerns over the company's affairs.

The 1784 Pitt's India Act (24 Geo. 3. Sess. 2. c. 25) was therefore subsequently enacted as a more radical reform. It marked the first step towards parliamentary control over the company and centralised administration in India.

== Background ==
By 1773, the East India Company (EIC) was in dire financial straits. The company was important to the British Empire because it was a monopoly trading company in India and the east, and many influential people were shareholders. The EIC paid £400,000 (equivalent to £38.3 million in 2015) annually to the government to maintain its monopoly but had been unable to meet its commitments since 1768 because of the loss of tea sales to America. About 85% of all the tea in America was smuggled Dutch tea. The EIC owed money to both the Bank of England and the government. It had 15 million lbs (6.8 million kg) of tea rotting in British warehouses and more en route from India. The act, complemented by the Tea Act 1773 (13 Geo. 3. c. 44), had the principal objective of reducing the surplus of tea held by the financially troubled EIC and improving the company's financial standing.

Lord North overhauled the management of the India Company with the act. The EIC had taken over large areas of India for trading purposes and had an army to protect its interests. Company men were not trained to govern, so North's government began moves towards government control since India was of national importance. The act set up a system whereby the British government supervised the work of the EIC. Company shareholders opposed the act, and the EIC was still a powerful lobbying group in Parliament despite its financial problems.

== Court of Directors ==
Before the act, the members of Court of Directors consisting of 24 members were elected for a period of 1 year. The act made provision for the 6 members to be elected every 4 years except the first 18 of 24 members -6 were elected for a term of 1 year. 6 were elected for a term of 2 years. 6 were elected for a term of 3 years. The remaining 6 for a term of 4 years. This ensured that every year 6 would exit from the office and then 6 could enter the office for a term of 4 years.

== Provisions ==
- The act limited company dividends to 6% until it repaid a £1.5m loan (passed by an accompanying act, the Tea Act 1773 (13 Geo. 3. c. 64)) and restricted the Court of Directors to four-year terms.
- First step taken by the British government to regulate and control the company's affairs in India.
- It prohibited the servants of company from engaging in any private trade or accepting presents or bribes from the "natives".
- The act elevated Governor of Bengal, Warren Hastings to Governor-General of Bengal and subsumed the presidencies of Madras and Bombay under Bengal's control. It laid the foundations for a centralised administration in India.
- The act named four additional men to serve with the Governor-General on an executive Supreme Council of Bengal: Lt-Gen John Clavering, George Manson, Richard Barwell, and Philip Francis for a period of five years. Decisions would be taken by majority of the council, and the Governor General could only vote in the case of a tie.
- The Supreme Court of Judicature at Fort William was established at Fort William at Calcutta (1774). British judges were to be sent to India to administer the British legal system that was used there. Sir Elijah Impey was the first chief justice. The court has both civil and criminal, and original and appellate jurisdiction.
- It permitted the company to keep its territorial possession in India. It had not taken away the company's power completely, hence being termed a 'regulating act'.

== Significance ==
The act holds great constitutional importance as it marked the beginning of parliamentary oversight over the East India Company's administration in India. Its key significances are:

- It was the first step taken by the British Parliament to regulate and control the affairs of the East India Company.
- It ended the dual government that had existed in Bengal since 1765, wherein the Company exercised diwani rights while the Nawab retained administrative control.
- The creation of the office of the Governor-General of Bengal laid the foundation for a centralised administrative structure that would evolve into the Government of India.
- It introduced the concept of collective responsibility through the Supreme Council, where decisions required a majority vote.
- The establishment of the Supreme Court of Judicature at Fort William (1774) in Calcutta introduced a formal judicial system, separating executive and judicial functions.
- It made Company servants legally accountable by prohibiting private trade and the acceptance of bribes or gifts from Indian rulers.

== Limitations ==
Despite its importance, the act had several shortcomings:

- The Governor-General had no veto power and could be outvoted by the Supreme Council, leading to administrative conflicts—as famously seen during the tenure of Warren Hastings.
- The jurisdiction of the Supreme Court was not clearly defined, causing frequent conflicts with the Supreme Council of Bengal.
- The act did not completely curtail the powers of the Court of Directors; the Company retained significant autonomy in commercial matters.
- The act made no provision for the governance of the Bombay and Madras presidencies in matters outside war, peace, and revenue, leaving gaps in centralised control.
- These limitations necessitated further reform, leading to Pitt's India Act 1784, which addressed many of these deficiencies.

== Subsequent developments ==
The whole act, except sections 42, 43 and 45, was repealed by section 130 of, and the fourth schedule to, the Government of India Act 1915 (5 & 6 Geo. 5. c. 61), which came into force on 1 January 1916.

The whole act was repealed by section 7(2) of, and the second schedule to, the Government of India (Amendment) Act 1916 (6 & 7 Geo. 5. c. 37), which came into force on 1 September 1916.

== See also ==
- East India Company Act
- Charter Act 1793
- Charter Act 1813
- Government of India Act 1833
- Government of India Act 1858
