= Pitt's India Act =

Act of the Parliament of Great Britain

East India Company Act 1784 (Note: The citation of this act by this short title was authorised by section 1 of, and the first schedule to, the Short Titles Act 1896. Due to the repeal of those provisions it is now authorised by section 19(2) of the Interpretation Act 1978.)
- Act of Parliament
- Parliament of Great Britain
- Long title: An Act for the better Regulation and Management of the Affairs of the East India Company and of the British Possessions in India, and for establishing a Court of Judicature for the more speedy and effectual Trial of Persons accused of Offences committed in the East Indies.
- Citation: 24 Geo. 3. Sess. 2. c. 25
- Territorial extent: Great Britain; British India

Dates
- Royal assent: 13 August 1784
- Commencement: 18 May 1784 (Note: Start of session.)
- Repealed: 1 September 1916
Other legislation
Amends	East India Company Act 1772
Amended by	East India Company (No. 1) Act 1786; East India Company Act 1786; Statute Law Revision Act 1888; Perjury Act 1911
Repealed by	Government of India (Amendment) Act 1916
Relates to	East India Company Act 1793; Saint Helena Act 1833; Government of India Act 1858

Status: Repealed

Text of statute as originally enacted

The East India Company Act 1784 (24 Geo. 3. Sess. 2. c. 25), also known as Pitt's India Act, was an act of the Parliament of the United Kingdom intended to address the shortcomings of the East India Company Act 1772 (13 Geo. 3. c. 63) by bringing the East India Company's rule in India under the control of the British Government. Named for British prime minister William Pitt the Younger, the act provided for the appointment of a Board of Control, and provided for a joint government of British India by the company and the Crown with the government holding the ultimate authority. A six-member board of control was set up for political activities and court of directors for financial/commercial activities. As the 1773 act had many shortcomings, it was necessary to pass another act to remove these defects.

== Provisions ==
The act provided for not more than six Privy Counsellors, including a Secretary of State and the Chancellor of the Exchequer to be appointed "Commissioners for the Affairs of India". Of these, not fewer than three formed a board to execute the powers under the act.

The board was presided over by the President of the Board of Control, who soon effectively became the minister for the affairs of the East India Company. Section 3 of the act provided that the President was to be the Secretary of State, or failing that, the Chancellor of the Exchequer, or failing that, the most senior of the other commissioners.

The act stated that the board would henceforth "superintend, direct and control" the government of the Company's possessions, in effect controlling the acts and operations relating to the civil, military and revenues of the Company.

The board was supported by a Secretary to the Board of Control.

The governing council of the company was reduced to three members. The governors of Bombay and Madras were also deprived of their independence. The governor-general was given greater powers in matters of war, revenue and diplomacy.

The act also stated that to pursue schemes of conquest and extension of dominion in India are measures repugnant to the wish, the honour and the policy of this nation. (This would later change with the rise of Napoleon and French interest in India).

By a supplementary act passed in 1786 Lord Cornwallis was appointed as the 2nd governor-general of Bengal, and he then became the effective ruler of British India under the authority of the Board of Control and the Court of Directors. The constitution set up by Pitt's India Act did not undergo any major changes until the Government of India Act 1858 (21 & 22 Vict. c. 106) brought the end of the company's rule in India.

== Background ==
The act was passed in British Parliament to correct the defects of the previously signed East India Company Act 1772 (13 Geo. 3. c. 63). The 1772 act's purpose was to overhaul the management of the East India Company's rule in India, but proved to not be a long-term solution. The 1772 act set up a system where it supervised the work of the company but did not take power for itself.

In 1781, both a selected and secret committee were set to go into the affairs of the company. This select committee searched into the relations between the Supreme Court and the Council in Bengal, while the secret committee caused the Maratha War. The reports they presented were openly used as an arsenal for weapons against the company by party orators in Parliament.

The act established the system of dual control of India and these changes continued through 1858. The company's territories In India were called the "British possession in India" for the first time. The British Government was given complete control over the company’s affairs and its administration in India. In the dual system of control, the company was represented by the Court of Directors and the British Government by the Board of Control. The act mandated that all civil and military officers disclose their property in India and Britain within two months of their joining. The Governor-General’s council's strength was reduced to three members. One of the three would be the Commander-in-Chief of the British Crown's army in India. The Governor-General was given casting vote. The Presidencies of Madras and of Bombay became subordinate to the Bengal Presidency. In effect, Calcutta became the capital of the British possessions in India.

Once the act was signed in 1784, there was more government control under Prime Minister William Pitt. This new act created a committee of six government appointees, known as the Board of Control, who were appointed to monitor and direct the company’s policies. Minister William Pitt became the youngest Prime Minister only at the age of 24. He was liked by many and was an amazing administrator who worked for efficiency and reform, to bring together a new generation of amazing administrators. Pitt’s India Act brought important changes in the constitution of the company. It constituted a department of state in England, also known as the Board of Control, whose purpose served to control the policy of the Court of Directors, introducing the Dual System of Government. It also placed the civil and military government of the company in due subordination to the Government in England.

The act had many perks such as removing many of the faults that the East India Company Act 1772 (13 Geo. 3. c. 63) had. An example would be that it ended an unjust division of authority in India. By reducing the Governor-General council’s members to three, it removed any chance of there being a tie and the Governor-General would have the final say. The act also settled the main lines of the company’s Home and Indian Government. For example, the head of the board was at first the Secretary of State without a special salary, but after 1773 a special President of the Board was appointed and this officer was ultimately responsible for the government of British India until he was succeeded in 1858 by the Secretary of State for India. The act also was a very skilful measure bearing all the marks of a political compromise.

However, the act had many shortcomings. The first being that it became obvious that the margins between government control and the company’s powers were hazy and personal. The Governor-General had to serve both the East India Company and the British Crown, which was set up for failure. The boundaries between the obligations of the Board of Control and the Court of Directors were unclear. The Governor-General had to make many sporadic decisions that deemed unfair to whoever it wasn't in favour towards.

== Subsequent developments ==
The whole act was repealed by section 7(2) of, and the second schedule to, the Government of India (Amendment) Act 1916 (6 & 7 Geo. 5. c. 37).

== Significance ==
Pitt's India Act 1784 is considered a landmark in the constitutional history of India. Its key significances are:

- It established, for the first time, a system of dual control over India — the East India Company retained its commercial functions through the Court of Directors, while the British government exercised political authority through the newly created Board of Control.
- The Company's territories in India were officially designated British possessions in India for the first time, marking a formal recognition of British sovereignty over Indian lands.
- It gave the Governor-General of Bengal the right of veto over his council and made the Presidencies of Madras and Bombay subordinate to Bengal, strengthening centralised administration.
- It introduced accountability among Company servants by mandating disclosure of property held in both India and Britain within two months of assuming office.
- It laid the structural groundwork for the eventual transfer of power to the British Crown, completed by the Government of India Act 1858 following the Revolt of 1857.
- It corrected the critical weakness of the Regulating Act 1773 by reducing the Supreme Council's membership to three, making governance more decisive and efficient.

== Limitations ==
Despite its far-reaching provisions, the Act had notable shortcomings:

- The boundaries of authority between the Board of Control and the Court of Directors were not clearly defined, leading to administrative confusion and occasional conflicts between the two bodies.
- The Governor-General was stripped of direct military command during emergencies, weakening his ability to respond swiftly to military crises on the ground.
- The dual system of control itself became a source of inefficiency, as the Company and the Crown sometimes pursued conflicting objectives in Indian administration.
- The Act made no substantive provisions for the welfare of the Indian population, focusing entirely on the structure of British governance.
- These unresolved issues necessitated the Charter Act 1813 and eventually the complete abolition of Company rule in 1858.

== See also ==
- Saint Helena Act 1833, third act following the Pitt's India Act.
- East India Company Act
