= Government of India Act 1833 =

Act of the Parliament of the United Kingdom

Saint Helena Act 1833
- Act of Parliament
- Parliament of the United Kingdom
- Long title: An Act for effecting an engagement with the East India Company, and for the better Government of His Majesty's Indian Territories, till the Thirtieth Day of April One thousand eight hundred and fifty-four.
- Citation: 3 & 4 Will. 4. c. 85
- Territorial extent: United Kingdom; British India

Dates
- Royal assent: 28 August 1833
- Commencement: 22 April 1834 (Note: Section 1.)
Other legislation
Amended by	India (North-West Provinces) Act 1835; Indian Councils Act 1861; Statute Law Revision Act 1874; Statute Law Revision Act 1890; Indian Councils Act 1909; Government of India Act 1912; Government of India Act 1915
Relates to	East India Company Act 1772; East India Company Act 1793

Status: Partially repealed

Text of statute as originally enacted

Revised text of statute as amended

Text of the Government of India Act 1833 as in force today (including any amendments) within the United Kingdom, from legislation.gov.uk.

The Government of India Act 1833 (3 & 4 Will. 4. c. 85), sometimes called the East India Company Act 1833 or the Charter Act 1833, is an act of the Parliament of the United Kingdom, later retitled as the Saint Helena Act 1833. (Note: The citation of this act by this short title was authorised by section 5 of, and the second schedule to, the Statute Law Revision Act 1948. Due to the repeal of those provisions, it is now authorised by section 19(2) of the Interpretation Act 1978.) It extended the royal charter granted to the East India Company for an additional twenty years, and restructured the governance of British India.

== Provisions ==
The act contained the following provisions:

- It ended the commercial activities of the British East India Company and made it a purely administrative body. In particular, the company lost its monopoly on trade with China and other parts of the Far East.
- While ending its commercial mandate, the act extended the East India Company's charter by 20 years. This meant that other provisions of the original Elizabethan charter, including the right to raise armies, wage war, and rule conquered territories, were perpetuated.
- It redesignated the Governor-General of Bengal as the Governor-General of India. For the first time, the government run by him was referred to as the 'Government of India.' His council is now known as the 'India Council'. Lord William Bentinck became the first Governor-General of India at the end of 1833.
- The "Governor-General in Council" was given exclusive legislative powers, that is the right to proclaim laws which would be enforced as the law of the land across the whole of British India.
- Thus, the act deprived the governors of Bombay and Madras of the legislative powers which they had enjoyed until then.
- The act attempted to introduce a system of open competitions for the selection of civil servants. However, this provision was negated after opposition from the Court of Directors who continued to hold the privilege of appointing company officials.
- The act categorically stated that no native of India should be disabled from holding any place, office, or employment, by reason of his religion.
- Control of the island of Saint Helena was transferred from the East India Company to the Crown.

== Subsequent developments ==
The whole act, except section 112 which vested Saint Helena in the monarchy, was repealed by section 130 of, and the fourth schedule to, the Government of India Act 1915 (5 & 6 Geo. 5. c. 61), which came into force on 1 January 1916.

112 Saint Helena vested in the crown.
The island of St Helena, and all forts, factories, public edifices, and hereditaments whatsoever in the said island, and all stores and property thereon fit or used for the service of the government thereof, shall be vested in his Majesty, and the said island shall be governed by such orders as his Majesty in council shall from time to time issue in that behalf.

== Name ==
When short titles were authorised for British legislation by the Short Titles Act 1896, the act was titled as the Government of India Act 1833. (Note: The citation of this act by this short title was authorised by section 1 of, and the first schedule to, the Short Titles Act 1896. Due to the repeal of those provisions it is now authorised by section 19(2) of the Interpretation Act 1978.) However, following the repeal of most of its provisions other than those dealing with Saint Helena, it was given a new short title by the Statute Law Revision Act 1948, as the Saint Helena Act 1833. (Note: The citation of this act by this short title was authorised by section 5 of, and the second schedule to, the Statute Law Revision Act 1948. Due to the repeal of those provisions, it is now authorised by section 19(2) of the Interpretation Act 1978.) As the main provision of the act was to extend the East India Company's charter, it is sometimes referred to as the Charter Act 1833, although this is not an official short title.

== Significance ==
The act is regarded as a watershed moment in the constitutional history of British India:

- It completely ended the East India Company's commercial activities, including its remaining monopoly over the tea trade and trade with China, transforming the Company into a purely administrative body acting as a trustee of the British Crown.
- The Governor-General of Bengal was redesignated as the Governor-General of India, with Lord William Bentinck becoming the first to hold the title, unifying administration across all of British India under a single authority.
- Legislative power was centralised entirely in the Governor-General in Council, stripping the Presidencies of Bombay and Madras of their independent legislative powers and creating a uniform legislative framework for all of British India.
- The act introduced the first Law Commission of India in 1834, with Lord Macaulay as its chairman, tasked with codifying and systematising Indian laws — a process that eventually produced the Indian Penal Code of 1860.
- It categorically stated that no native of India should be denied any place, office or employment under the Company on grounds of religion, place of birth, descent, or colour — a foundational principle of equality in Indian administrative history.
- The act attempted to introduce open competition for the selection of civil servants, laying an early conceptual groundwork for what would later become the Indian Civil Service.
- It provided for the abolition of slavery in India, directing the Governor-General in Council to take measures to mitigate and eventually end slavery — which was formally abolished in 1843.
- Control of the island of Saint Helena was transferred from the Company to the Crown, reflecting the broader shift of sovereign authority from the Company to the British government.

== Limitations ==
Despite its progressive provisions, the Act had significant shortcomings:

- The provision for open competition in civil service recruitment was quickly nullified due to strong opposition from the Court of Directors, who retained their patronage powers of appointment.
- The act led to an over-centralisation of power in the hands of the Governor-General, often making governance of the distant Presidencies of Madras and Bombay slow and inefficient.
- The Presidencies of Madras and Bombay had no representation in the central legislative council, creating a disconnect between local needs and central legislation.
- The equality clause regarding Indian employment remained largely symbolic; in practice, British officials continued to dominate all senior administrative positions.
- A provision to divide Bengal into two separate Presidencies of Agra and Fort William was included in the Act but was never implemented, leaving the governance of Bengal unwieldy.
- The act failed to address the growing demand for Indian representation in the legislative process, an issue that would continue to intensify until the Charter Act 1853.

== See also ==
- East India Company Act
- Regulating Act 1773
- East India Company Act 1784
- Charter Act 1793
- Charter Act 1813
- Government of India Act 1858
