= Charter Act 1793 =

Act of the Parliament of Great Britain

East India Company Act 1793 (Note: The citation of this act by this short title was authorised by section 1 of, and the first schedule to, the Short Titles Act 1896. Due to the repeal of those provisions it is now authorised by section 19(2) of the Interpretation Act 1978.)
- Act of Parliament
- Parliament of Great Britain
- Long title: An Act for continuing in the East India Company for a further Term the Possession of the British Territories in India, together with their exclusive Trade under certain Limitations; for establishing further Regulations for the Government of the said Territories, and the better Administration of Justice within the same; for appropriating to certain Uses the Revenues and Profits of the said Company, and for making Provision for the good Order and Government of the Towns of Calcutta, Madras, and Bombay.
- Citation: 33 Geo. 3. c. 52
- Territorial extent: Great Britain

Dates
- Royal assent: 11 June 1793
- Commencement: 11 June 1793 (Note: The Acts of Parliament (Commencement) Act 1793.)
- Repealed: 1 January 1916

Other legislation
- Repeals/revokes: Trade to the East Indies Act 1718; East India Company Act 1786
- Amended by: Indian Presidency Towns Act 1815; Statute Law Revision Act 1887; Statute Law Revision Act 1888; Government of India Act 1912
- Repealed by: Government of India Act 1915
- Relates to: Regulating Act 1773; East India Company Act 1784; East India Company Act 1813; Government of India Act 1833; Government of India Act 1858

Status: Repealed

Text of statute as originally enacted

The East India Company Act 1793 (33 Geo. 3. c. 52), also known as the Charter Act 1793, was an act of the Parliament of Great Britain which renewed the Charter issued to the British East India Company (EIC). The veto which was originally given to Lord Cornwallis was continued for all the Governors-General. Bombay and Madras presidency were kept under superintendence of Fort William.

== Provisions ==
In contrast with legislation concerning British India proposed in the preceding two decades, the 1793 Act "passed with minimal trouble". The Act made only fairly minimal changes to either the system of government in India or British oversight of the company's activities. Most importantly, the company's trade monopoly was continued for a further 20 years. Salaries and pensions for the staff, paid members of the Board of Control, and others involved in Indian administration were now charged to the Company, to be paid from Indian revenues, since they were regarded as government officials rather than mere merchants. Private trade with China was permitted under the name "country trade", which allowed the Company to avoid direct responsibility for illegal trading of opium. Other provisions of the Act included:

1. The Governor-General was granted extensive powers over the subordinate presidencies of Madras and Bombay.
2. The Governor-General's power of over-ruling his council was affirmed.
3. Royal approval was mandated for the appointment of the Governor-General, the governors, and the Commander-in-Chief.
4. This Act continued the company's rule over the British territories in India.
5. It continued the company's trade monopoly in India for another 20 years.
6. The Act established that “acquisition of sovereignty by the subjects of the Crown is on behalf of the Crown and not in its own *right,” which clearly stated that the company's political functions were on behalf of the British government.
7. The company's dividends were allowed to be raised to 10%.
8. The Governor-General was given more powers.
9. When the Governor-General was present in Madras or Bombay, he would supersede in authority over the governors of Madras and Bombay.
10. In the Governor-General's absence from Bengal, he could appoint a vice president from among the civilian members of his Council.
11. The composition of the Board of Control changed. It was to have a President and two junior members, who were not necessarily members of the Privy Council.
12. The salaries of the staff and the Board of Control were also now charged to the company.
13. After all expenses, the company had to pay the British government 5 Lakh British Pounds from the Indian revenue annually.
14. Senior company officials were barred from leaving India without permission. If they did so, it would be considered as a resignation.
15. The company was granted the authority to grant licenses to individuals and company employees to carry on trade in India (known as the "privilege" or "country" trade), which paved the way for shipments of opium to China.
16. Revenue administration was separated from judicial responsibilities, which brought an end to the functioning of Maal Adalats, or revenue courts.

== Next charter act ==
The company's charter was next renewed by the East India Company Act 1813 (53 Geo. 3. c. 155).

== Subsequent developments ==
The whole act was repealed by section 130 of, and the fourth schedule to, the Government of India Act 1915 (5 & 6 Geo. 5. c. 61), which came into force on 1 January 1916.

== See also ==
- East India Company Act
- Regulating Act 1773
- East India Company Act 1784
- East India Company Act 1813
- Government of India Act 1833
- Government of India Act 1858
