= Indian High Courts Act 1861 =

Act of the Parliament of the United Kingdom

Indian High Courts Act 1861 (Note: The citation of this act by this short title was authorised by section 1 of, and the first schedule to, the Short Titles Act 1896. Due to the repeal of those provisions it is now authorised by section 19(2) of the Interpretation Act 1978.)
- Act of Parliament
- Parliament of the United Kingdom
- Long title: An Act for establishing High Courts of Judicature in India.
- Citation: 24 & 25 Vict. c. 104
- Territorial extent: United Kingdom; British India

Dates
- Royal assent: 6 August 1861
- Commencement: 6 August 1861 (Note: The Acts of Parliament (Commencement) Act 1793.)
- Repealed: 1 January 1916
Other legislation
Amended by	Statute Law Revision Act 1878; Indian Councils Act 1909
Repealed by	Government of India Act 1915
Relates to	Indian Civil Service Act 1861; Indian Councils Act 1861

Status: Repealed

Text of statute as originally enacted

The Indian High Courts Act 1861 (24 & 25 Vict. c. 104) was an act of the Parliament of the United Kingdom to authorize the Crown to create High Courts in the Indian colony. Queen Victoria created the High Courts in Calcutta, Madras, and Bombay by letters patent in 1862. These High Courts would become the precursors to the High Courts in the modern day India, Pakistan, and Bangladesh. The act was passed after the First War of Independence of 1857 and consolidated the parallel legal systems of the Crown and the East India Company.

The act was passed alongside the Indian Civil Service Act 1861 (24 & 25 Vict. c. 54) and the Indian Councils Act 1861 (24 & 25 Vict. c. 67).

== Abolishing existing courts ==
Section 8 of the act abolished the Supreme Courts at Calcutta, Madras, and Bombay; the Sadar Diwani Adalat and the Sadar Faujdari Adalat at Calcutta; Sadar Diwani Adalat and Sadar Faujdari Adalat at Madras; and the Sadar Diwani Adalat and Sadar Faujdari Adalat at Bombay. By the act three high courts were established in 1862: on 26 June at Madras, on 1 July at Calcutta, on 14 August at Bombay.

== Qualifications of High Court judges ==
Each High Court could consist of a chief justice and up to 15 judges. Under section 3 of the act, judges could be selected from barristers (with five years of experience), civil servants (with ten years of experience including three years as a zillah judge), judges of small cause courts or sudder ameen (with five years of experience), or pleaders of lander courts or High Courts (with five years of experience).

The High Court of a state is the highest court of the state and all other courts of the state work under it. Normally there is one High Court in every state but there can be one High Court shared between two or more states as well, according to the constitution. There is one High Court at Chandigarh for Punjab, Haryana and Union Territory of Chandigarh. Similarly there is one High Court at Guwahati which serves the Indian states of Assam, Arunachal Pradesh, Mizoram and Nagaland.

=== Composition ===
In every High Court, there is a Chief Justice and many other judges whose number is defined by the President of India.

Appointment of the Judges: The Chief Justice of a High Court is appointed by the President with the consultation of the Chief Justice of the Supreme Court and the Governor of the State. The other judges are appointed by the will of President, Governor and the Chief Justice of High Court.

=== Qualifications for the judges ===
(a) He should be a citizen of India.

(b) He should have been (I) a judge for 10 years of subordinate court under the judicial service of the state or (ii) an advocate for 10 years in a High Court in India (Article 217).

Tenure: Originally the age of the retirement of the judges of the High Courts was fixed at 60 but it was raised to 62 in 1963 according to the 15th amendment of the Constitution.

Removal of judges: A judge may leave his office by resigning. He will send his letter of resignation to the President. His office would be considered to have been vacated if he is appointed as a judge of the Supreme Court or is transferred to some other High Court. A judge of a High Court may also be removed like a judge of the Supreme Court. A judge of High Court may be removed by the President if the Parliament passes a motion against him by an absolute majority and 2/3rd majority of the members present and voting, both the Houses sitting separately.

Salary:

The pay of the Chief Justice of a High Court is rupees 250,000/- per month and that of the other judges is rupees 225,000/- per month.

Powers and functions

=== Original jurisdiction ===
The original jurisdiction of the High Court is restricted.

(a) Every High Court under Article 226 is empowered to issue writs, orders, directions including writs in the nature of Habeas Corpus, Mandamus, Prohibition, Quo-warranto and Certiorari or any of them to any person or authority with in its territory for the enforcement of the Fundamental Rights and for any other purpose.

(b) The original jurisdiction of High Court extends to matters of admiralty, matrimonial, contempt of court and cases ordered to be transferred to High Court by lower court.

(c) The High Courts of Mumbai, Kolkata and Chennai have original jurisdiction on hearing straightway cases involving the Christians and Parsies.

(d) The High Courts of Mumbai, Kolkata and Chennai exercise original civil jurisdiction when the amount involved is more than two thousand rupees.

=== Appellate jurisdiction ===
The appellate jurisdiction of the High Courts extends so:

(a) The High Court can hear appeals in civil cases if the amount involved in the case is at least Rs. 5000.

(b) The High Court in criminal cases hears the appeal in which the accused has been sentenced to four years imprisonment by the Sessions Judge.

(c) The death sentence awarded by Sessions Judge is subject to approval by the High Court.

(d) The High Court hear the cases involving interpretation of the Constitution or Law.

(e) The High Court hears the cases on income tax, sales tax etc.

=== Power of judicial review ===
The state High Courts like the Supreme Court has the power of judicial review. A High Court has the power to strike down any law of the State or any order of the executive if it violates any provision of the constitution or curtails or takes any of the Fundamental Rights of the people.

=== Administrative and supervisory power ===
The State High Court performs many administrative functions within its Territorial Jurisdiction. It exercises the power of superintendence and control over all courts and tribunals throughout the territory except the military tribunals.

== Judicial tenure and seniority ==
Under section 5 of the act, judges served at the pleasure of Her Majesty. The chief justice had precedence over judges, whereas judges had seniority based on appointment. The retirement age for judges was set at 62 years.

== Jurisdiction ==
Under section 9 of the act, each High Court had "all such powers and authority for and in relation to the administration of justice" including original and appellate jurisdiction over civil, criminal, admiralty, vice-admiralty, testamentary, intestate, and matrimonial matters.

== Subsequent developments ==
The whole act was repealed by section 130 of, and the fourth schedule to, the Government of India Act 1915 (5 & 6 Geo. 5. c. 61), which came into force on 1 January 1916.
