= Indian Councils Act 1861 =

Act of the Parliament of the United Kingdom

Indian Councils Act 1861 (Note: Section 1.)
- Act of Parliament
- Parliament of the United Kingdom
- Long title: An Act to make better Provision for the Constitution of the Council of the Governor General of India, and for the Local Government of the several Presidencies and Provinces of India, and for the temporary Government of India in the event of a Vacancy in the Office of Governor General.
- Citation: 24 & 25 Vict. c. 67
- Territorial extent: United Kingdom; British India

Dates
- Royal assent: 1 August 1861
- Commencement: (Note: Section 54.)
- Repealed: 1 January 1916
Other legislation
Amends	Government of India Act 1833; Government of India Act 1853
Amended by	Statute Law Revision Act 1878; Indian Councils Act 1892; Indian Councils Act 1909; Government of India Act 1912
Repealed by	Government of India Act 1915
Relates to	Indian Civil Service Act 1861; Indian High Courts Act 1861

Status: Repealed

Text of statute as originally enacted

The Indian Councils Act 1861 (24 & 25 Vict. c. 67) was an act of the Parliament of the United Kingdom that transformed India's Executive Council to function as a cabinet run on the portfolio system. The Executive Council, formerly the Council of Four, was enlarged by addition of fifth member, and later a sixth. This cabinet had six "ordinary members", who each took charge of a separate department in Calcutta's government: home, revenue, military, law, finance, and (after 1874) public works. The military Commander-in-Chief sat in with the council as an extraordinary member. The Viceroy was allowed, under the provisions of the act, to overrule the council on affairs if he deemed it necessary, as was the case in 1879, during the tenure of Lord Lytton.

The Viceroy was allowed to issue ordinances lasting six months if the Legislative Council is not in session in an emergency.

After the Indian Rebellion of 1857, Sir Syed Ahmed Khan advised the British Government to take Indian nationals into the administration of India. He argued in his pamphlet The Causes of the Indian Revolt that the failure of the British to admit Indians into the Legislative Council, prevented them from having any say in government policies that touched them directly and was the major cause behind the revolt.

The Secretary of State for India, Sir Charles Wood, believed that the act was of immense importance: "the act is a great experiment. That everything is changing in India is obvious enough, and that the old autocratic government cannot stand unmodified is indisputable."

The act restored the legislative powers of Bombay and Madras Presidencies taken away by the Charter Act 1833 (3 & 4 Will. 4. c. 85). The legislative council at Calcutta was given extensive authority to pass laws for British India as a whole, but the legislative councils at Bombay and Madras were given the power to make laws for the "Peace and good Government" for only their respective presidencies. The Governor General was given the power to create new provinces for legislative purposes and could appoint lieutenant governors for the provinces.

However, from India's point of view, the act did little to improve the influence of Indians in the legislative council. The role of council was limited to advice, and no financial discussion could take place.

The act was passed alongside the Indian Civil Service Act 1861 (24 & 25 Vict. c. 54) and the Indian High Courts Act 1861 (24 & 25 Vict. c. 104).

== Significance ==
The act is a landmark in the constitutional and political history of India, enacted in the aftermath of the Indian Rebellion of 1857:

- It marked the beginning of representative institutions in India by involving Indians in the legislative process for the first time. Lord Canning, the then Viceroy, nominated three Indians to the Legislative Council in 1862 — the Raja of Benaras, the Maharaja of Patiala, and Sir Dinkar Rao.
- The act gave formal recognition to the portfolio system introduced by Lord Canning in 1859, under which each member of the Viceroy's Executive Council was assigned a specific department — home, revenue, military, finance, and law — transforming the Council into a miniature cabinet.
- It restored legislative powers to the Presidencies of Bombay and Madras, which had been stripped of these powers by the Government of India Act 1833 (3 & 4 Will. 4. c. 85), thereby reversing the centralising tendency that had built up since the East India Company Act 1872 (13 Geo. 3. c. 63).
- It provided for the establishment of new legislative councils for Bengal, the North-Western Provinces, and Punjab — established in 1862, 1866, and 1897 respectively — extending the legislative framework across British India.
- The act empowered the Viceroy to issue ordinances without the concurrence of the Legislative Council during an emergency, with such ordinances valid for up to six months — providing executive flexibility in times of crisis.
- It empowered the Viceroy to make rules and orders for the smooth transaction of business in the council, improving the operational efficiency of central administration.
- The act initiated a policy of association — of bringing Indians into a nominal partnership in governance — which was continued and expanded through the Indian Councils Act 1892 and the Morley-Minto Reforms of 1909.
- It laid the structural groundwork for the gradual evolution of representative and responsible government in India, eventually culminating in the Government of India Act 1935 and Indian independence in 1947.

== Limitations ==
Despite its historic importance, the act had several significant shortcomings:

- The role of the Legislative Council was purely advisory — it could not initiate legislation, discuss financial matters, or question executive decisions without prior government consent, making Indian representation largely symbolic.
- Indian members were nominated, not elected, and were drawn exclusively from the upper classes — zamindars, princes, and nobles — leaving the vast majority of the Indian population entirely unrepresented.
- The Viceroy retained absolute authority over the Legislative Council and could override any decision. Furthermore, the Secretary of State in London could reject legislation even after the Viceroy had approved it.
- The legislative councils had no budgetary control whatsoever — financial matters were entirely beyond their purview, a significant democratic deficit that would remain unaddressed until the Government of India Act 1919.
- While the act restored legislative powers to Bombay and Madras, the over-centralisation of power in the Viceroy's office continued in practice, limiting the meaningful autonomy of provincial administrations.
- The emergency ordinance power granted to the Viceroy could be — and was — used to bypass the Legislative Council on important matters, undermining the very principle of legislative oversight the act sought to introduce.
- The act made no provision for elections, no matter how indirect, leaving all appointments in the hands of British officials and making genuine Indian participation in governance a distant prospect.

== Subsequent developments ==
The act was substantially amended by the Indian Councils Act 1892 (55 & 56 Vict. c. 14).

The whole act was repealed by section 130 of, and the fourth schedule to, the Government of India Act 1915 (5 & 6 Geo. 5. c. 61), which came into force on 1 January 1916.

== See also ==
- Bengal Legislative Council
- Bombay Legislative Council
- Madras Legislative Council
- Indian Councils Act 1892
