= Indian Councils Act 1909 =

Act of the Parliament of the United Kingdom

Indian Councils Act 1909 (Note: Section 8(1).)
- Act of Parliament
- Parliament of the United Kingdom
- Long title: An Act to amend the Indian Councils Acts, 1861 and 1892, and the Government of India Act, 1833.
- Citation: 9 Edw. 7. c. 4
- Territorial extent: United Kingdom

Dates
- Royal assent: 25 May 1909
- Commencement: 15 November 1909 (Note: Section 8(2).)
- Repealed: 1 January 1916
Other legislation
Amends	Government of India Act 1833; Indian Councils Act 1861; Indian Councils Act 1892
Amended by	Government of India Act 1912
Repealed by	Government of India Act 1915
Relates to	Indian Councils Act 1871; Indian Councils Act1874

Status: Repealed

Text of statute as originally enacted

The Indian Councils Act 1909 (9 Edw. 7. c. 4), commonly known as the Morley–Minto or Minto–Morley Reforms, was an act of the Parliament of the United Kingdom that brought about a limited increase in the involvement of Indians in the governance of British India. Named after Viceroy Lord Minto and Secretary of State John Morley, the act introduced elections to legislative councils and admitted Indians to councils of the Secretary of State for India, the viceroy, and to the executive councils of Bombay and Madras states. Muslims were granted separate electorates according to the demands of the All-India Muslim League.

== Background ==
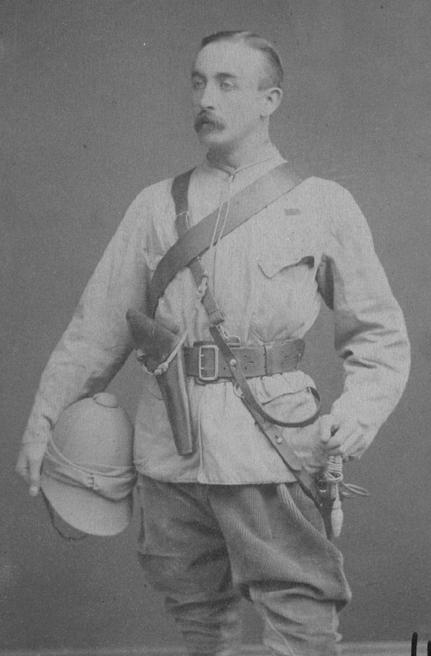
In 1906, Lord Minto met with the Simla Deputation.

In 1885, the Indian National Congress was founded at Gokuldas Tejpal Sanskrit College in Bombay, gathering a small group of colonial India's educated elite. One of their main grievances was the difficulty Indians faced when trying to enter the civil service and administrative roles. Queen Victoria had promised racial equality in the selection of civil servants for the government of India in the Government of India Act 1858 ( 21 & 22 Vict. c. 10 6), but in practice Indians remained largely outside spheres of power. Examinations for the services were exclusively held in Great Britain and were open only to male applicants between the ages of 17 and 22 (this was later changed to a range of 17 to 19 in 1878). British administrators' reluctance to accept Indians into the civil service only further closed administrative positions to Indians.

In the face of growing Indian demands, the Indian Councils Act 1892 (55 & 56 Vict. c. 14) introduced several reforms to the legislative councils in British India; it expanded the number of members in the central and provincial councils, and permitted universities and other bodies in India to recommend and elect representatives. However, the government continued to approve many bills despite strong Indian opposition; additionally, it did not give members control over the budget, as they were only allowed to debate it, not vote on it. Unhappy with such minor concessions, many Indian National Congress members blamed the lack of progress on the Congress's moderate strategy and agitated for a more assertive strategy against the British.

After the Liberal Party's victory in the 1906 general election, liberal philosopher John Morley became the Secretary of State for India; Morley strove to implement the equality of opportunity promised in 1892, but also wished to 'rally the moderates' against a rising wave of radical nationalists and political terrorism. In May and June 1906, Morley and the moderate Congress leader Gokhale discussed the Congress's demands for reforming the Secretary of State's Council, the executive councils of the viceroy and governors, and the legislative councils. In July 1906, during a speech on the Indian Budget in the House of Commons, Morley announced that he would consider proposals on reform. This spurred leaders of the Muslim League to send the Simla Deputation to advocate for Muslim interests.

== Advocation of separate Muslim electorates ==
On 1 October 1906 Minto received the deputation from the newly founded Muslim League, which comprised numerous Muslims from all Indian provinces except for the Northwest Frontier. The Muslim League was founded to prevent the rise of an emergence of a Hindu dominated political system, and made a number of demands to Minto. They argued that the special interests of Muslims must be maintained, and pushed for the separate election of Muslims to the provincial councils and requiring the election of a sufficient number of Muslims to the Imperial Legislative Council to avoid reducing Muslims to an insignificant minority Minto encouraged the foundation of the League as a rival organization to the Indian National Congress, and promised to the deputation that they would give consideration to Muslim demands.

Like the Muslim League, British administrators also sought to prevent the rise of an Indian majority in the legislature, and persuaded Minto of the danger of Muslim discontent to British rule and that the League's demands were representative of most Indian Muslims' wishes.

Morley expressed a desire for reconciliation between territorial representation and Muslim demands, but with the support of Herbert Risley, the Home Secretary, separate Muslim electorates were successfully implemented in the final plan. This sympathy to the Muslim League led to the false suspicion that the 1906 deputation had been invited by the viceroy, rather than simply received.

== Morley–Minto Reforms ==
The act itself conferred some political reforms. Both central and provincial legislative councils increased in size and expanded their memberships. Local bodies would elect an electoral college, which in turn would elect the members of provincial legislatures, who in turn would elect members of the central legislature. Under the act, Muslim members were to be elected by only Muslim voters, dividing the electorate.

Previously, provincial councils had a majority of their members appointed by civil service officials, referred to as an "Official Majority"; this system was lifted with the act's passage. However, an official majority was retained on the Central Legislative Council.

The elected Indians were allowed to table resolutions, debate budgetary matters, and ask supplementary questions, which they were previously prevented from doing so. Nevertheless, they were not permitted to discuss foreign policy or relations with the princely states were. The British executive also retained an absolute veto over all legislation.

== Reaction and legacy ==
After the passage of the act, Morley appointed two Indian members to his council Whitehall, and also persuaded the viceroy Lord Minto to appoint the first Indian member to the viceroy's Executive Council, Satyendra P. Sinha. Though the act did increase Indian participation in the legislative councils, the act did nothing to address the Indian National Congress's demands for colonial self-government. The introduction of separate electorates for Muslims was viewed by the Congress as an imperial attempt at control through an elective policy of divide-and-rule.

The First World War substantially changed Indian expectations for representation, with India providing substantial support for the British war effort in men, material, and money. India's sacrifice led to stronger demands, which would result in Indian Secretary Edwin Montagu announcing further constitutional reforms towards responsible government in 1917, eventually leading to the Montagu–Chelmsford Reforms and the Government of India Act 1919.

== Subsequent developments ==
The whole act was repealed by section 130 of, and the fourth schedule to, the Government of India Act 1915 (5 & 6 Geo. 5. c. 61), which came into force on 1 January 1916.

== See also ==
- Government of India Act (disambiguation)
- Indian Councils Act 1861
- Indian Councils Act 1892
- Government of India Act 1919

== Sources ==
- Hardy, Thomas Hardy (1972). The Muslims of British India. Cambridge University Press. ISBN 978-0-521-09783-3.
- Ilbert, Courtenay (1911). "The Indian Councils Act, 1909". Journal of the Society of Comparative Legislation. 11 (2): 243–254. ISSN 1479-5973. JSTOR 752520.
- Kulke, Hermanne; Rothermund, Dietmar (2004). A History of India (PDF) (4th ed.). Routledge. Archived from the original (PDF) on 26 February 2015.
- Metcalf, Barbara; Metcalf, Thomas (2006). A Concise History of Modern India (PDF) (2nd ed.). Cambridge University Press.
- Robb, Peter (2002). A History of India (1st ed.). Palgrave.
- Robinson, Francis (1974). Separatism Among Indian Muslims: The Politics of the United Provinces' Muslims, 1860–1923. Cambridge University Press.
- Stein, Burton (1998). A History of India (1st ed.). Oxford: Blackwell publishers. ISBN 978-0-631-17899-6.
- Talbot, Ian; Singh, Gurharpal (23 July 2009). The Partition of India. Cambridge University Press. ISBN 978-0-521-85661-4.
