= Government of India Act 1858 =

UK law transferring India to imperial rule

Government of India Act 1858 (Note: The citation of this act by this short title was authorised by section 1 of, and the first schedule to, the Short Titles Act 1896. Due to the repeal of those provisions it is now authorised by section 19(2) of the Interpretation Act 1978.)
- Act of Parliament
- Parliament of the United Kingdom
- Long title: An Act for the better Government of India.
- Citation: 21 & 22 Vict. c. 106
- Territorial extent: United Kingdom; British India

Dates
- Royal assent: 2 August 1858
- Commencement: 1 November 1858 (Note: Section 74.)
- Repealed: 1 July 1937
Other legislation
Amended by	Government of India Act 1859; Criminal Statutes Repeal Act 1861; Indian Councils Act 1861; Statute Law Revision Act 1878; Indian Councils Act 1909; Government of India Act Amendment Act 1911
Repealed by	Government of India Act 1919; Ministers of the Crown Act 1937
Relates to	East India Company Act 1784; East India Company Act 1793

Status: Repealed

Text of statute as originally enacted

The Government of India Act 1858 (21 & 22 Vict. c. 106) was an act of the Parliament of the United Kingdom passed on 2 August 1858. Its provisions called for the liquidation of the East India Company (who had up to this point been ruling much of India under the auspices of Parliament) and the transferral of its functions to the British Crown.

Lord Palmerston, then-Prime Minister of the United Kingdom, introduced a bill in 1858 for the transfer of control of the government of India from the East India Company to the Crown, referring to the grave defects in the existing system of the government of India. However, before this bill was to be passed, Palmerston was forced to resign on another issue.

Edward Stanley, 15th Earl of Derby (who would later become the first Secretary of State for India), subsequently introduced another bill which was titled "An Act for the Better Governance of India" and it was passed on 2 August 1858. This act provided that India was to be governed directly and in the name of the Crown.

== History ==
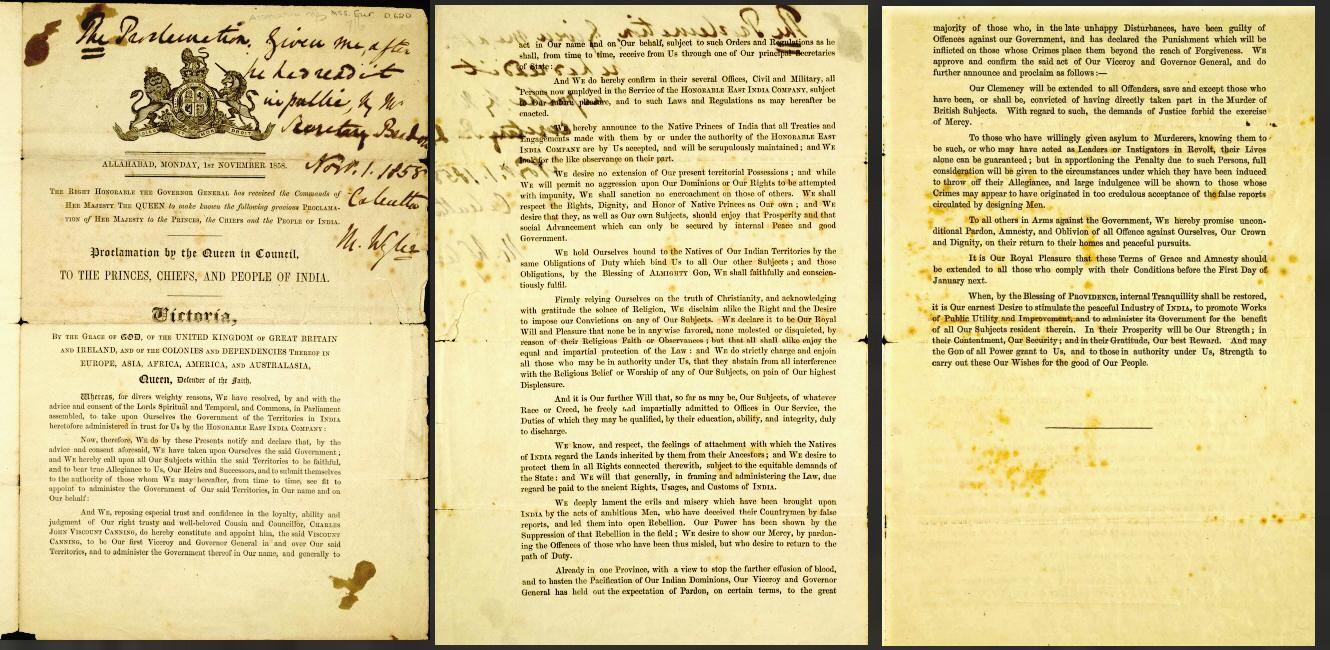
The proclamation to the "Princes, Chiefs, and People of India", issued by Queen Victoria on 1 November 1858.

The Indian Rebellion of 1857 compelled the British government to pass the act. The act was followed a few months later by Queen Victoria's proclamation to the "Princes, Chiefs, and People of India", which, among other things, stated, "We hold ourselves bound to the natives of our Indian territories by the same obligation of duty which bind us to all our other subjects" (p. 2)

== Provisions ==
- The company's territories in India were to be vested in the Queen, the company ceasing to exercise its power and control over these territories. India was to be governed in the Queen's name.
- The Queen's Principal Secretary of State received the powers and duties of the company's Court of Directors. A council of fifteen members was appointed to assist the Secretary of State for India. The council became an advisory body in Indian affairs. For all the communications between Britain and India, the Secretary of State became the real channel.
- The Secretary of State for India was empowered to send some secret despatches to India directly without consulting the council. He was also authorised to constitute special committees of the council.
- The Crown was empowered to appoint a Governor-General and the governors of the presidencies.
- An Indian Civil Service was to be created under the control of the Secretary of State.
- All the property and other assets of the East India Company were transferred to the Crown. The Crown also assumed the responsibilities of the company as they related to treaties, contracts, and so forth.

The act ushered in a new period of Indian history, bringing about the end of Company rule in India. The era of the new British Raj would last until the Partition of India in August 1947, when the territory of India was granted dominion status as the Dominion of Pakistan and the Dominion of India.

== Subsequent developments ==
The whole act, except section 4, was repealed by section 130 of, and the fourth schedule to, the Government of India Act 1915 (5 & 6 Geo. 5. c. 61), which came into force on 1 January 1916.

Section 4 of the act was repealed by section 11(2) of, and the fourth schedule to, the Ministers of the Crown Act 1937 (1 Edw. 8. & 1 Geo. 6. c. 38), which came into force on 1 July 1937.

== See also ==
- East India Stock Dividend Redemption Act 1873
- British Raj
- India Office
- Governor-General of India
- Indian Councils Act 1909
- Government of India Act 1935
- History of Bangladesh
- History of India
- History of Pakistan
