= Emperor of India =

Title used by British monarchs from 1876 to 1948

Emperor (Empress) of India
- Kaisar-i-Hind
- Imperial
- The Star of India

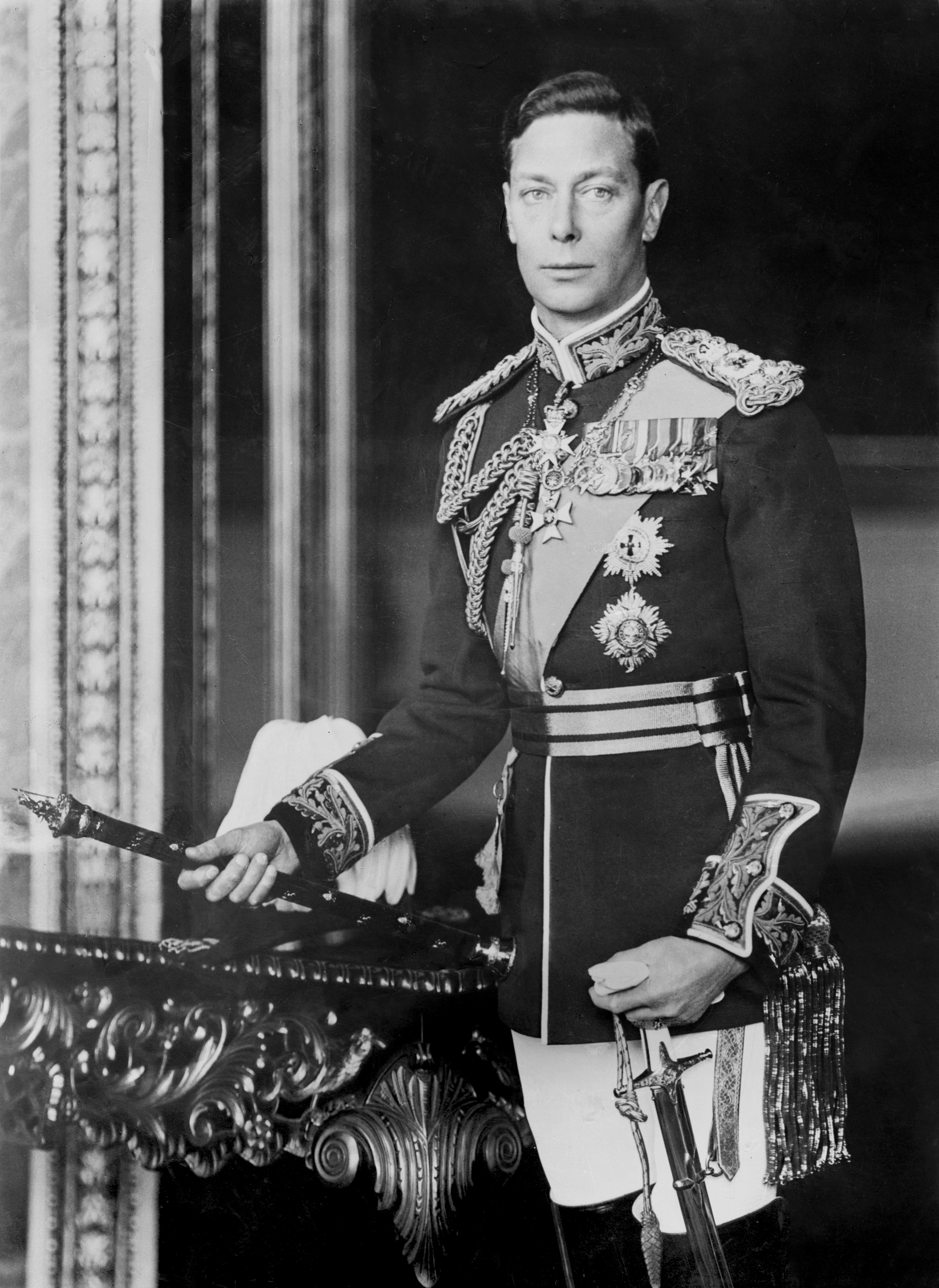
- Last to reign George VI; 11 December 1936 – 15 August 1947

Details
- First monarch: Victoria
- Last monarch: George VI (continued as monarch of India and Pakistan)
- Formed: 1 May 1876
- Abolished: 22 June 1948

Emperor (or Empress) of India was a title used by British monarchs from 1 May 1876 (with the Royal Titles Act 1876) to 22 June 1948 to signify their sovereignty over the British Indian Empire as its imperial head of state. The image of the emperor or empress appeared on Indian currency, in government buildings, railway stations, courts, on statues, etc. Oaths of allegiance were made to the emperor or empress and the lawful successors by the governors-general, princes, governors, commissioners in India in events such as imperial durbars.

The title was abolished on 22 June 1948, with a royal proclamation of George VI made under the Indian Independence Act 1947, which had provided that the monarch could decide that the words "Emperor of India" were to be omitted in the royal styles of address and from customary titles. This was almost a year after he had become the titular monarch of the newly partitioned and independent dominions of India and Pakistan in August 1947. The monarchy was ended by the establishment of the Republic of India in 1950 and the Islamic Republic of Pakistan in 1956.

== History ==
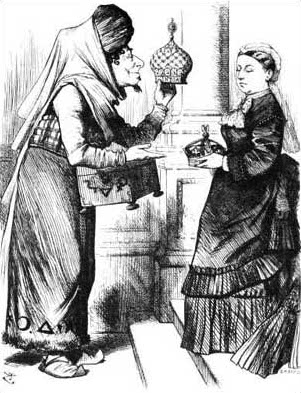
New Crowns for Old: Disraeli and Victoria in a cartoon mimicking a scene in Aladdin where lamps are exchanged. She made him Earl of Beaconsfield at this time.

After the nominal Mughal emperor Bahadur Shah Zafar was deposed at the conclusion of the Indian Rebellion of 1857 (10 May 1857 – 1 November 1858), the government of the United Kingdom decided to transfer control of British India and the princely states from the mercantile East India Company (EIC) to the Crown, thus marking the beginning of the British Raj. The EIC was officially dissolved on 1 June 1874, and the British prime minister, Benjamin Disraeli, decided to offer Queen Victoria the title "Empress of India" shortly afterwards. Victoria accepted this style on 1 May 1876. The first Delhi Durbar (which served as an imperial coronation) was held in her honour eight months later on 1 January 1877.

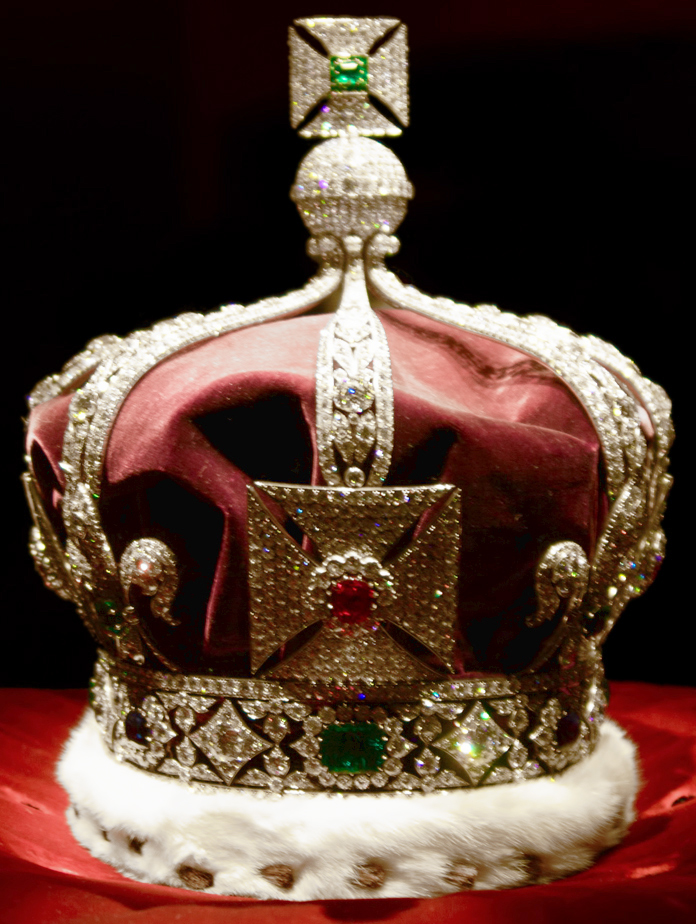
The Imperial Crown of India

The idea of having Queen Victoria proclaimed Empress of India was not particularly new, as Lord Ellenborough had already suggested it in 1843 upon becoming the governor-general of India. By 1874, Major-General Sir Henry Ponsonby, the Queen's private secretary, had ordered English charters to be scrutinised for imperial titles, with Edgar and Stephen mentioned as sound precedents. The Queen, possibly irritated by the strength of republicanism in Britain in the early 1870s and her declining influence, was urging the move. Another factor may have been that the Queen's first child, Victoria, was married to Frederick, the heir apparent to the German Empire. Upon becoming empress, she would outrank her mother. By January 1876, the Queen's insistence was so great that Benjamin Disraeli felt that he could procrastinate no longer. Initially, Victoria had considered the style "Empress of Great Britain, Ireland, and India", but Disraeli had persuaded the Queen to limit the title to India in order to avoid controversy. Hence, the title Kaisar-i-Hind was coined in 1876 by the orientalist G.W. Leitner as the official imperial title for the British monarch in India. The term Kaisar-i-Hind means emperor of India in the vernacular of the Hindi and Urdu languages. The word kaisar, meaning 'emperor', is a derivative of the Roman imperial title caesar (via Persian and Ottoman Turkish – see Kaiser-i-Rum), and is cognate with the German title Kaiser, which was borrowed from the Latin at an earlier date.

Many in the United Kingdom, however, regarded the assumption of the title as an obvious development from the Government of India Act 1858, which resulted in the founding of British India, ruled directly by the Crown. The public were of the opinion that the title of "queen" was no longer adequate for the ceremonial ruler of what was often referred to informally as the "Indian Empire". The new styling underlined the fact that the native states were no longer a mere agglomeration but a collective entity.

George V's signature with the initials R I (Rex Imperator)

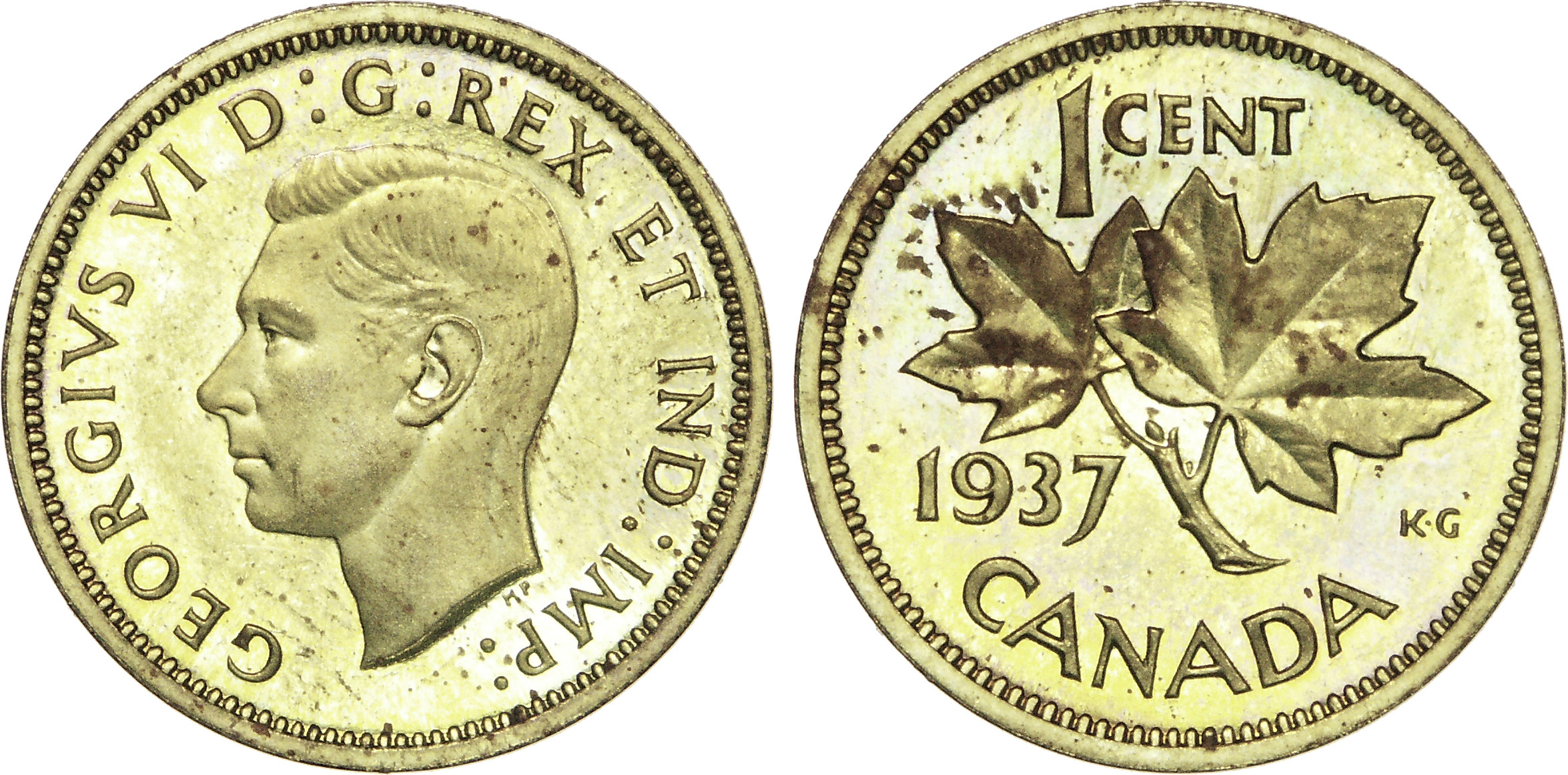
A Canadian 1-cent coin with the inscription Ind. Imp. (Indiae Imperator)'

When Edward VII ascended to the throne on 22 January 1901, he continued the imperial tradition laid down by his mother, Queen Victoria, by adopting the title Emperor of India. Three subsequent British monarchs followed in his footsteps, and the title continued to be used after India and Pakistan had become independent on 15 August 1947. It was not until 22 June 1948 that the style was officially abolished.

The first emperor to visit India was George V. For his imperial coronation ceremony at the Delhi Durbar, the Imperial Crown of India was created. The Crown weighs 920 g (2.03 lb) and is set with 6,170 diamonds, 9 emeralds, 4 rubies, and 4 sapphires. At the front is a very fine emerald weighing 32 carats (6.4 g). The King wrote in his diary that it was heavy and uncomfortable to wear: "Rather tired after wearing my crown for 3 1/2 hours; it hurt my head, as it is pretty heavy."

The title "Emperor of India" did not disappear when British India became the Union of India (1947–1950) and Dominion of Pakistan (1947–1952) after independence in 1947. George VI retained the title until 22 June 1948, the date of a royal proclamation made in accordance with Section 7 (2) of the Indian Independence Act 1947, reading: "The assent of the Parliament of the United Kingdom is hereby given to the omission from the Royal Style and Titles of the words Indiae Imperator and the words "Emperor of India" and to the issue by His Majesty for that purpose of His Royal Proclamation under the Great Seal of the Realm." Thereafter, George VI remained monarch of Pakistan until his death in 1952, and of India until it became the Republic of India on 26 January 1950.

British coins, and those of the Empire and the Commonwealth, had routinely included the abbreviated title Ind. Imp. Coins in India, on the other hand, had the word empress, and later king-emperor in English. The title appeared on coinage in the United Kingdom throughout 1948, with a further royal proclamation made on 22 December under the Coinage Act 1870 to omit the abbreviated title.

== List of title-holders ==
Portrait	Name	Birth	Reign	Death	Consort	Imperial Durbar	Royal House
	Victoria	24 May 1819	1 May 1876 – 22 January 1901	22 January 1901	None (Note: Victoria's husband Prince Albert died on 14 December 1861.)	1 January 1877 (represented by Lord Lytton)	Hanover
	Edward VII	9 November 1841	22 January 1901 – 6 May 1910	6 May 1910	Alexandra of Denmark	1 January 1903 (represented by Lord Curzon)	Saxe-Coburg and Gotha
	George V	3 June 1865	6 May 1910 – 20 January 1936	20 January 1936	Mary of Teck	12 December 1911	Saxe-Coburg and Gotha (1910–1917) Windsor (1917–1936)
	Edward VIII	23 June 1894	20 January 1936 – 11 December 1936	28 May 1972	None	None (Note: Edward VIII abdicated after less than one year of reign.)	Windsor
	George VI	14 December 1895	11 December 1936 – 15 August 1947	6 February 1952	Elizabeth Bowes-Lyon	None (Note: A durbar was deemed expensive and impractical due to poverty and demands for independence.)	Windsor

== See also ==
- Indian independence movement
- Kaisar-i-Hind Medal
