= Gaper =

Type of figurehead, often used in storefronts of some drug stores in the Netherlands

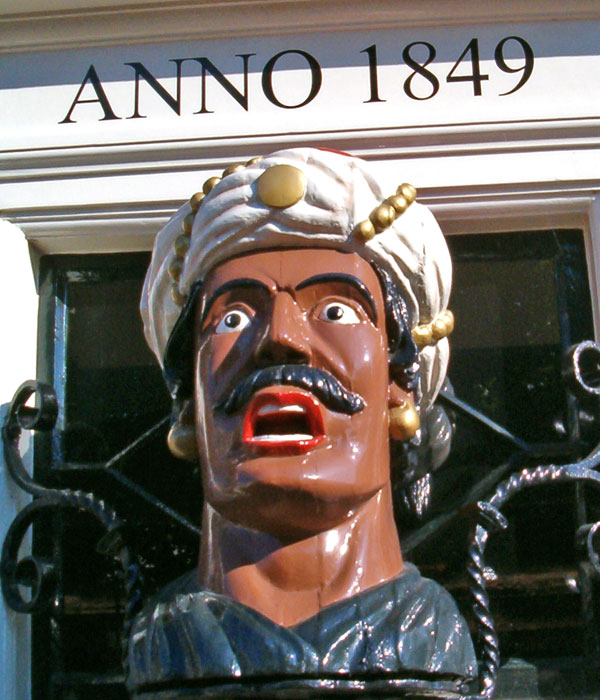
Gaper on the front of "Van der Pigge", a pharmacy in Haarlem

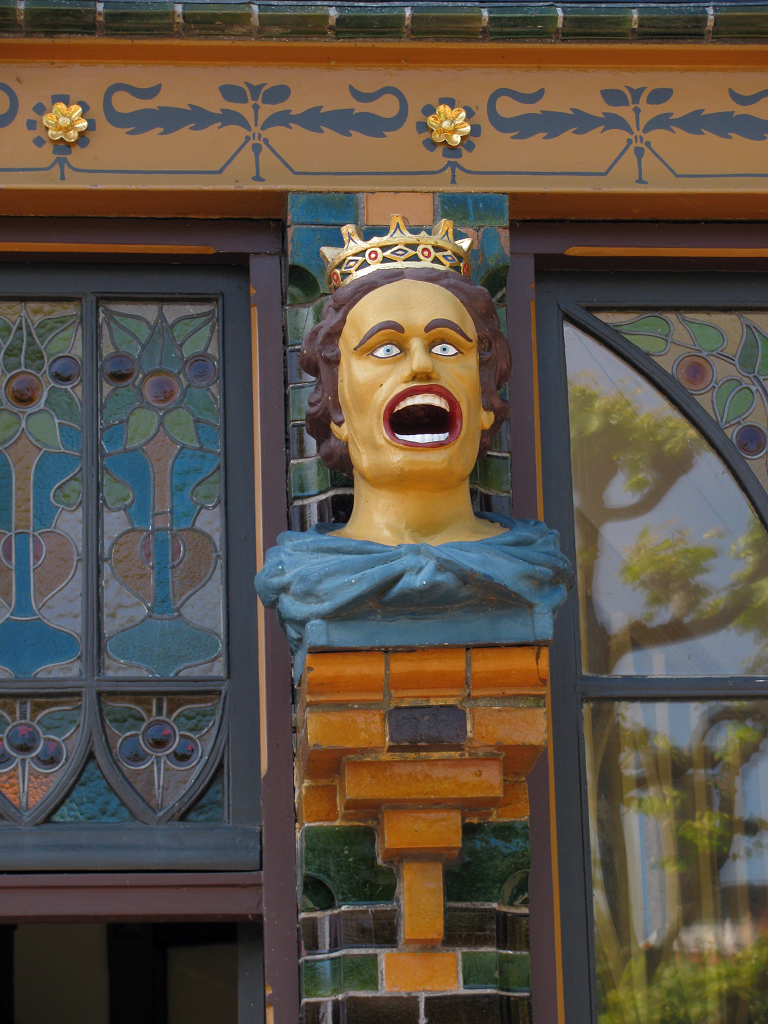
Gaper in Zuiderzeemuseum

A gaper (Dutch pronunciation: [ˈɣaːpər]) is a stone or wooden figurehead, often depicting a Moor, Muslim, or North African. The figurehead first appeared in the late 16th century as a hangout sign used outside the storefronts of drug stores in the Netherlands. The meaning of gaper is the same in English; the figurehead is always displayed with an open mouth, sometimes with a pill resting on his tongue.

The gaper's gaping tongue could represent the intake of medicine and grimace represents the bitter taste of the medicine. The gaper takes on various appearances that are symbolic of the origin for the pharmacist's practice or medicinal ingredients. There are stories of the gaper as a symbol of the pharmacist's traveling "quack" or helper. Recently, gaper figureheads have been stolen or removed from storefronts. Now, few remain within public view in the city of Amsterdam. Outside museum collections, fewer than 50 can be seen on buildings. Some have now lent their names to cafes, such as De Vergulde Gaper in Amsterdam.

== Origin ==
Turkish fashion, Japonerie, and Chinoiserie are said to be a source of inspiration for creating the gapers. The origin of the gaper, mostly Southern or exotic, symbolizes the origin of the ingredients used in the drugstore's medicines. During the 17th century, Western European trade with continents such as Asia and Africa introduced new spices from far and unknown places. Many exotic medicine components entered Europe through trade with the Ottoman Empire. Europeans traded with the Ottomans for senna leaves, opium, saffron, turmeric, and various resins, gums, and minerals, incense, myrrh, and bitumen. The spices and ingredients were brought back to Europe and later dried and sold by a chemist.

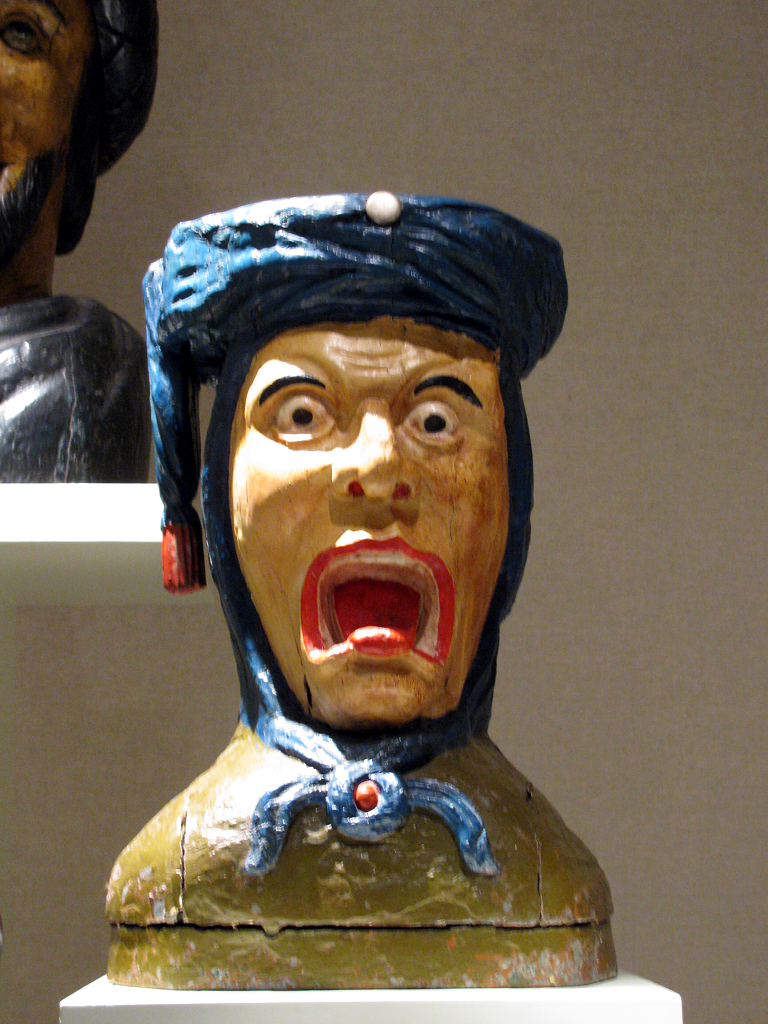
Gaper in Zuiderzeemuseum

=== Design, style, and symbolism ===
Each gaper is hand cut and painted using a stone or wood base. They are usually displayed with an open mouth or with their tongues sticking out. Recent research indicates that the open mouth originates from the way the chemist's customers gaped with astonishment when they saw the enormous variety of exotic substances inside. Gapers have facial expressions ranging from innocent to humorous to suffering. Gapers takes on various appearances with each instance being unique. Their individual designs are claimed to be specific to the specialties of the drugstore.

The oriental gapers are categorized between two identities: the Muslim and the Moor, both referring to people from the Maghreb in North-West Africa. Gapers with dark brown or black skin were used to represent the moors. The common oriental gaper often wore a turban with gold earrings. The turban confirmed an exotic origin that suggested the origin of the medicines to customers.

There are also many white gapers, often looking very ill with a pale skin color or having a facial expression of suffering and pain. These symbolize the patients of the chemist.

There were also 'golden' gapers, gapers with a crown and gapers with a monkey on their shoulder. Although women have taken up the chemist's profession since 1950, in Holland, few gapers depict a female. Before 1950, the profession of chemist was an exclusively male preserve. A law of 1865 prohibited women from following education to become a chemist. The first female chemist in the Netherlands (also one of the first female retailers) was Mia Ranke, who opened her chemist's shop in 1934. The gaper referring to illness or a sick patient commonly wore a hat with a hanging point with a tassel or pom-pom attached to it. Some gapers were depicted in uniform, as a fire brigade, police or a Roman soldier. In the French era (1795–1813) there was a push towards a national policy on medicine sales. The gapers in uniform were introduced during the second half of the 19th century after the government extended authority on the sale of medicines.

The gaper had several identities that suggest background information or a story to the onlooker. The gaper as a jester would "refer to the helper of the traveling person or quack". The helper acted as a patient who, for example, would picture the miracle provided and instantly healed his illness. This whole play was accompanied by many theatrical gestures and grimaces. Then the quack called everyone who wanted to hear how well the treatment worked, to pull in as many customers as possible. The traveling quack would settle in a store with a wooden sign of the trusted helper placed by the store's front door. As a symbol for the jester or help, the gaper would perform silly acts outside the store or in privacy to entertain customers and bring in more business. The Oriental dressed gaper possibly refers to the use of ingredients such as aloe vera, opium and gum arabic in medicines. It would "reference to the origin of the opium that is in the store sold in the form of sleeping dumplings." It is difficult to say if all the different types of gapers have been around since the beginning. It is also possible that most of the different characters were a later development.

== Use ==
The gaper in the late 16th-century functioned as a hangout out sign on the street. Not only did the figurehead communicate information about the origin of the medicines, but it was also a tool for luring in customers. In this period there were no house numbers. The gaper served as a hangout known as a recognizable point for business. Pharmacies often decorated their storefronts with 'rarities' to invoke customer curiosities. Exotic items such as a stuffed crocodile or tortoise, ostrich eggs, deer antlers, narwhal teeth, sawfish teeth, elk legs, and peacock feathers were popular decorations. Some say that the gaper was used to taunt non-buying bystanders in the street. The gaper could have also served as a mirror image of the drugstore's pharmacist. Historical images show that the cap with a hanging point and tassel, similar to some hats depicted on gapers, was regularly worn by the 16th-century pharmacists.

=== Saturated market ===
Beginning in 1840, the demand for medicine quickly became unbalanced. This caused many drugstores to close, taking the gaper figureheads with them. The Act on the Exercise of Medicine in 1865 declared that the pharmacy had to be separate from the drugstore. Pharmacists were required to have a diploma, if not, then they were no longer considered a chemist. This caused the drug stores to change their appearance. The pharmacy displayed the mortar as a symbol for the ability to prepare medicines, while the druggists continued to use the gaper as a symbol. This caused a large decline in the numbers of gapers left in the cities.

== Controversy ==
Recently, gaper figureheads have been stolen from storefronts. However, some have been later returned to new locations throughout the Netherlands. The gaper on the facade of Wijde Heisteeg 4 was stolen and delivered back in 2004 on the sidewalk outside the Municipal Archive on the Amsteldijk. There are stories of gapers being vandalized and used for jokes. A gaper from the Wolvenstraat in Amsterdam was pushed off of its platform by pranksters in March 1960. In 1830, a gaper was stuffed with gunpowder by a group of students and then blown up in the middle of the street. In 1895, the gaper on Heiligeweg 42 was given a large piece of liver sausage in its mouth. The gaper at this address also disappeared in 2008, there is still no clarity as to where it has gone. The reasoning for theft and associating the gaper with jokes are also unclear.

There is speculation that the disappearance of the gaper figureheads is caused by the weather. The gapers are hung outside storefronts and exposed to rain for long periods of time. This has caused many wooden gaper figureheads to rot or split. This is clearly visible with some preserved figureheads in museum archives. The decaying or splitting causes the gaper to fall completely apart over time. Some gapers were protected with a layer of lead-mix and flaxseed oil over the paint. Others received a lead plate on top of their hats so the rain did not end up directly on the wood.

Some gapers disappeared during the Second World War. The gaper that was hanging on Lange Delft in Middelburg was lost in 1940 during a bombing. Made in 1693, it was the oldest preserved gaper in the Netherlands. The gaper on the corner of Gasthuisstraat in Gorinchem disappeared one morning during the war. It is speculated that it was taken as a war booty, or maybe for wood in someone's stove.

There is still uncertainty about the origin and historical reasoning for the gaper. According to folklore, people used to hang monsters with their tongue sticking out off of buildings to ward off evil spirits. Some researchers explore the gaper in connection to certain medieval folklore stories. However, there still isn't much solid evidence as to why certain types of gapers were depicted and why the gaper became the figurehead of pharmacists drug supply.

== Conservation ==
The gaper is now a historical collector's item. The Royal Archeology Society in Amsterdam received a gaper in both 1882 and 1883. Meanwhile, the Museum of Antiquities in Groningen was given a gaper in 1891 and 1892. Also, Oudheidkundige Vereniging Flehite in Amersfoort received a gaper in 1893. The Haarlem chemist Anton van Os (1889–1982), for example, gathered at least 50 gapers from all over the country from the 1930s until his death. Now about 120 copies from before 1925 have been retained.

== See also ==
- Dutch architecture
- Figureheads
- History of The Netherlands
