= Charles Fawcett =

Charles Fawcett may refer to:

- Charles Fawcett (historian), British historian
- Charles Fawcett (politician) (1813–1890), Australian politician
- Charles Bungay Fawcett (1883–1952), British geographer
- Charles Fernley Fawcett (1915–2008), American adventurer, resistance fighter and actor
