= Trade between Western Europe and the Mughal Empire in the 17th century =

When Babur, the founder of the Mughal dynasty conquered northern India in 1526, the wealth of the country already largely depended on foreign trade, exporting India's enormous production of many types of commodities, in particular textiles. These left India by land and by sea, the latter in relatively small ships making relatively short voyages from the east and west coasts, as they had done for centuries. By the time Indian commodities reached Western Europe, normally after passing through several intermediary traders, they were enormously expensive.

During the 17th century the Mughal Empire ruling nearly all the subcontinent was still a confident superpower with huge military strength. European countries wanted to access Indian goods, both processed natural products such as spices, and indigo dye, and manufactured products, above all textiles. The Europeans tried to interest the Indian market in European products with very little success, apart from a small demand for furs and luxury products such as clocks for India's royal courts. Europeans therefore needed to pay for their purchases with gold.

== Attitude of the Mughal empire to the trade ==
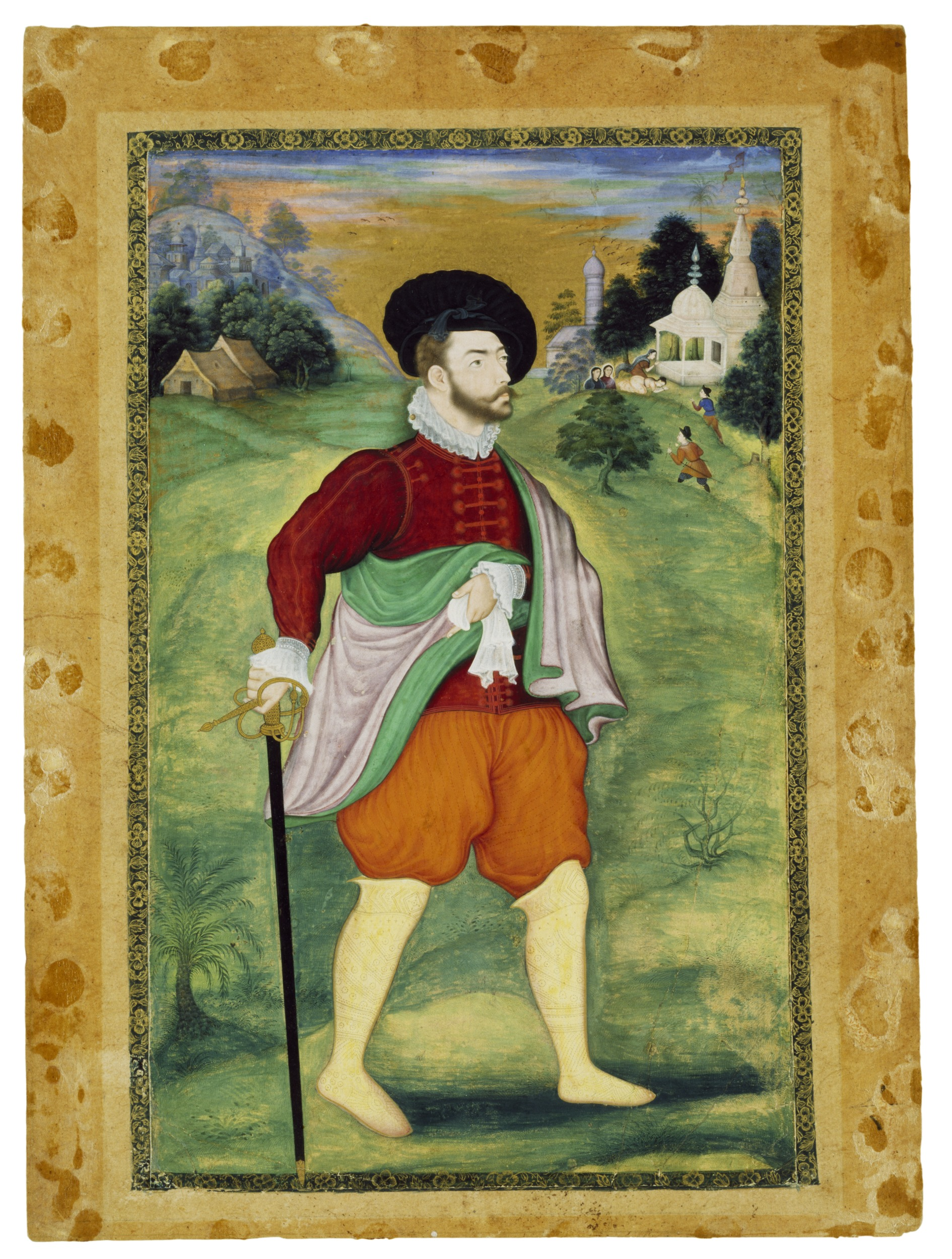
Portrait of a European painted by Mughal artists, Ca.1590

Contact between Western Europe and the Mughal Empire was put into practice at the very beginning of the 17th century. The Portuguese, English, and later on, the Dutch were the ones to trade with the Mughal Empire. As the first Islamic power on the Indian subcontinent, the Mughal empire was more interested in assimilating the land, studying the history, customs and religion of the people occupying this area, and communicating with the other two Islamic empires – the Safavid and the Ottoman Empires.

The Mughal Empire had strong leaders, however, very different in approach and strategy. Akbar was known for his tolerance towards unorthodox Muslims and Hindus. The Akbarnama, a book written by Abu’l Fazl on the life and rule of Akbar, gives a lot of evidence on how Hinduism was viewed and explained by the Muslims. Along with being tolerant towards his Hindu and Muslim subjects, Akbar welcomed Portuguese Jesuits, which allowed Portugal to enter the trade with Indian goods. At the very end of his rule, the British, Dutch, and Portuguese started to trade with the Mughal Empire as well. Even though the trade started during the reign of Akbar the Great, his son Jahangir was the one to strengthen this economic activity in the Indian subcontinent.

== Main agreements ==
The English and Dutch were granted 21-year permission of monopoly in the “East Indies”, which was followed by the retorted answer from the Indian kings – they encouraged the establishment of coastal posts for trade. Half a century afterwards, the competition for trade in the Indian Ocean was increased by the establishment of the French East India Company in 1664. It followed Jean-Baptiste Colbert's doctrine of mercantilism that claimed to keep the national exports greater than the imports. As France's First Minister of State, he had enormous influence in directing this strategy. In his Memorandum on English Alliances and Memorandum to the King on Finances written in 1669 and 1670 respectively, Jean-Baptiste Colbert defended his theory and tried to figure out a way to undercut the Dutch trade. This document gave evidence of the strength of the Netherlands’ trade in the 17th century not only in India but also in the Caribbean. Moreover, it gave the precise numbers of the Dutch superiority over both the British and the French – 15,000 to 16,000 vessels per year versus 3,000 to 4,000 for the British and 500 to 600 for the French. The British managed to increase the trade in textiles to 22.7 million square meters over a period of just twenty years. They did that in the same year that France intervened in the Indian trade.

== The implementation of trade on the local level in India and the various trading posts ==
The trade in India was implemented mainly on the coast. During the 17th century there were two big Islamic empires between Western Europe and the Mughal Empire – the Safavid and the Ottoman Empires – their trade was implemented only by ships. Therefore, the main ports were on the coast of both the Arabian Sea and the Bay of Bengal with the small exception of Calcutta, located on the bank of the river Hooghly, yet still accessible by water. Bombay and Surat on the Arabian sea coast and Madras (today’s Chennai) or - as the British named it - Fort St. George, were the four main locations of Indo-European trade during the 17th century. Trade as a tool for the Early World globalization was very prosperous and profitable for both the European and the Indian merchants.

The sudden and completely unexpected collapse of Mughal power in a few years after the death of Aurangzeb in 1707 led to a very different situation in the following century, as local rulers formed autonomous or semiautonomous states. Eventually the European trading companies took part in Indian political conflicts and processes; by 1800 the British East India Company had become the most powerful force in the sub-continent.
