= Charles Fawcett (historian) =

British historian

Sir Charles Fawcett (1869–1952) was a British historian. He served in the Indian Civil Service while India was a part of the British Empire. He published a number of articles and books related to Indian history and was an expert on the British East India Company. His most famous article, published in October 1937 in the Mariner's Mirror, suggests that the design of the flag of the United States may have been derived from the flag and jack of the British East India Company.
