= East India Stock Dividend Redemption Act 1873 =

Act of the Parliament of the United Kingdom

East India Stock Dividend Redemption Act 1873 (Note: Section 1.)
- Act of Parliament
- Parliament of the United Kingdom
- Long title: An Act to provide for the Redemption or Commutation of the Dividend on the Capital Stock of the East India Company, and for the transfer of the Security Fund of the India Company to the Secretary of State in Council of India, and for the dissolution of the East India Company.
- Citation: 36 & 37 Vict. c. 17
- Territorial extent: United Kingdom; British India

Dates
- Royal assent: 15 May 1873
- Commencement: 15 May 1873 (Note: The Acts of Parliament (Commencement) Act 1793.)
- Repealed: United Kingdom: 10 March 1966
Other legislation
Amended by	Statute Law Revision Act 1883
Repealed by	United Kingdom: Statute Law Revision Act 1966; Republic of Ireland: Statute Law Revision Act 2007
Relates to	Government of India Act 1858

Status: Repealed

Text of statute as originally enacted

The East India Stock Dividend Redemption Act 1873 (36 & 37 Vict. c. 17) was an act of the Parliament of the United Kingdom, passed in 1873, that formally dissolved the British East India Company.

The act was one of the East India Loans Acts 1859 to 1893.

By the time of the act's passing, the British East India Company had already effectively ceased to exist. The company's governmental responsibilities were transferred to the Crown and its liquidation was set in motion by the Government of India Act 1858 (21 & 22 Vict. c. 106). The company's 240,000-man military force had also been transferred to the authority of the Crown (subsequently being incorporated into the British Indian Army), significantly reducing its influence.

== Subsequent developments ==
The whole act was repealed by section 1 of, and the schedule to, the Statute Law Revision Act 1966, which came into force on 10 March 1966.
