= East India Company =

British joint-stock company (1600–1874)

East India Company 1600–1874
- Company flag (1801)

- Coat of arms (1698) Motto: Auspicio Regis et Senatus Angliae; Latin for "By command of the King and Parliament of England"
- Type: Public; Partially state-owned enterprise State-owned enterprise (after Government of India Act 1858)
- Industry: International trade
- Founded: 31 December 1600; 425 years ago
- Founders: William Cavendish; George Clifford; James Lancaster; John Spencer; John Watts (et al.)
- Defunct: 1 June 1874; 152 years ago
- Fate: Nationalised: Territories and responsibilities ceded to the British Government by the Government of India Act 1858; Dissolved by the East India Stock Dividend Redemption Act 1873
- Headquarters: East India House, London, United Kingdom
- Key people: Thomas Smythe; 1st Governor
- Products: Cotton, silk, indigo dye, sugar, salt, spices, slaves, saltpetre, tea, and opium
- Number of employees: 50,000 (1710s)

The East India Company (EIC) (Note: Also known as the Honourable East India Company (HEIC), East India Trading Company (EITC), the English East India Company, or (after 1707) the British East India Company, and informally known as John Company, Company Bahadur, or simply The Company.) was an English, and later British, joint-stock company that was founded in 1600 and dissolved in 1874. It was formed for Indian Ocean trade, initially with the East Indies (which included the Indian subcontinent and Southeast Asia), and later with East Asia. The company gained control of large parts of the Indian subcontinent and Saint Helena prior to 1834. At its peak, the company was the largest corporation in the world by various measures and had its own armed forces in the form of the company's three presidency armies, totalling about 260,000 soldiers, twice the size of the British Army at certain times.

Originally chartered as the "Governor and Company of Merchants of London Trading into the East-Indies", the company rose to account for half of the world's trade during the mid-1700s and early 1800s, particularly in basic commodities including cotton, silk, indigo dye, sugar, salt, spices, saltpetre, tea, gemstones, and later opium. The company also initiated the beginnings of the British Raj in the Indian subcontinent.

The company eventually came to rule large areas of the Indian subcontinent, exercising military power and assuming administrative functions. Under this government-like rule, the company used torture to extract taxes, reduced much of the population to poverty and mishandled the Great Bengal famine of 1770, caused by crop failure and smallpox, during which an estimated 10 million people starved to death.

Company-ruled areas in the region gradually expanded after the Battle of Plassey in 1757, and by 1858 most of modern India, Pakistan and Bangladesh, along with Lower Burma, was either ruled by the company or princely states closely tied to the company by treaties. Following the Indian Rebellion of 1857, the Government of India Act 1858 led to the British Crown assuming direct control of present-day Bangladesh, India, Pakistan, and Myanmar in the form of the new British Raj. The company subsequently experienced recurring problems with its finances, despite frequent government intervention. The company was dissolved in 1874 under the terms of the East India Stock Dividend Redemption Act enacted one year earlier, as the Government of India Act had by then rendered it vestigial, powerless, and obsolete. The official government machinery of the British Empire had assumed its governmental functions and absorbed its armies.

== History ==
=== Origins ===
In 1577, Francis Drake set out on an expedition from England to plunder Spanish settlements in South America in search of gold and silver. Sailing in the Golden Hind, he achieved this, and then sailed across the Pacific Ocean in 1579, known then only to the Spanish and Portuguese. Drake eventually sailed into the East Indies and came across the Moluccas, also known as the Spice Islands, and met Sultan Babullah. In exchange for linen, gold, and silver, the English obtained a large haul of exotic spices, including cloves and nutmeg. Drake returned to England in 1580 and became a hero; his circumnavigation raised an enormous amount of money for England's coffers, and investors received a return of some 5,000 per cent. Thus started an important element in the eastern design during the late sixteenth century.

With England at war with Spain and Portugal in 1585, trade was now cut off, and Queen Elizabeth I resorted to privateering. Soon after Thomas Cavendish's circumnavigation in 1587 and the Spanish Armada's defeat the following year, the captured Spanish and Portuguese ships and cargoes laid the foundation for further privateering to even more distant zones of the conflict. London merchants presented a petition to Elizabeth I for permission to sail to the Indian Ocean, and beyond with the Spice Islands of particular interest. The aim was to deliver a decisive blow to the Spanish and Portuguese monopoly of far-eastern trade. Elizabeth granted her permission and in 1591, James Lancaster in the Bonaventure with two other ships, financed by the Levant Company, sailed from England around the Cape of Good Hope to the Arabian Sea, becoming the first English expedition to reach India that way. Having sailed around Cape Comorin to the Malay Peninsula, they preyed on Spanish and Portuguese ships there before returning to England in 1594.

The biggest prize that galvanised English trade was the seizure of a large Portuguese carrack, the Madre de Deus, by Walter Raleigh and the Earl of Cumberland at the Battle of Flores on 13 August 1592. When she was brought in to Dartmouth she was the largest vessel ever seen in England and she carried chests of jewels, pearls, gold, silver coins, ambergris, cloth, tapestries, pepper, cloves, cinnamon, nutmeg, benjamin (a highly aromatic balsamic resin used for perfumes and medicines), red dye, cochineal and ebony. Equally valuable was the ship's rutter (mariner's handbook) containing vital information on the China, India, and Japan trade routes.

In 1596, three more English ships sailed east but all were lost at sea. A year later however saw the arrival of Ralph Fitch, an adventurer merchant who, with his companions, had made a remarkable nine year overland journey to Mesopotamia, the Persian Gulf, the Indian Ocean, India and Southeast Asia. Fitch was consulted on Indian affairs and gave even more valuable information to Lancaster.

=== Formation ===
In 1599, a group of prominent merchants and explorers met to discuss a potential East Indies venture under a royal charter. Besides Fitch the group included Stephen Soame, then Lord Mayor of London; Thomas Smythe, a powerful London politician and administrator; Richard Hakluyt, writer and proponent of English colonisation of the Americas; and several other sea-farers who had served with Drake and Raleigh.

On 22 September, the group stated their intention "to venture in the pretended voyage to the East Indies (the which it may please the Lord to prosper)" and to themselves invest £30,133 (over £4,000,000 in today's money). Two days later, the "Adventurers" reconvened and resolved to apply to the Queen for support of the project. Although their first attempt had not been completely successful, they sought the Queen's unofficial approval to continue. They bought ships for the venture and increased their investment to £68,373.

They convened again a year later, on 31 December 1600, and this time they succeeded; the Queen responded favourably to a petition by George, Earl of Cumberland and 218 others, including James Lancaster, Sir John Harte, Sir John Spencer (both of whom had been Lord Mayor of London), the adventurer Edward Michelborne, the nobleman William Cavendish and other aldermen and citizens. She granted her charter to their corporation named Governor and Company of Merchants of London trading into the East Indies. For a period of fifteen years, the charter awarded the company a monopoly on English trade with all countries east of the Cape of Good Hope and west of the Straits of Magellan. Any traders there without a licence from the company were liable to forfeiture of their ships and cargo (half of which would go to the Crown and half to the company), as well as imprisonment at the "royal pleasure".

The charter named Thomas Smythe as the first governor of the company, and 24 directors (including James Lancaster) or "committees", who made up a Court of Directors. They, in turn, reported to a Court of Proprietors, who appointed them. Ten committees reported to the Court of Directors. By tradition, business was initially transacted at the Nags Head Inn, opposite St Botolph's church in Bishopsgate, before moving to East India House on Leadenhall Street.

=== Early voyages to the East Indies ===
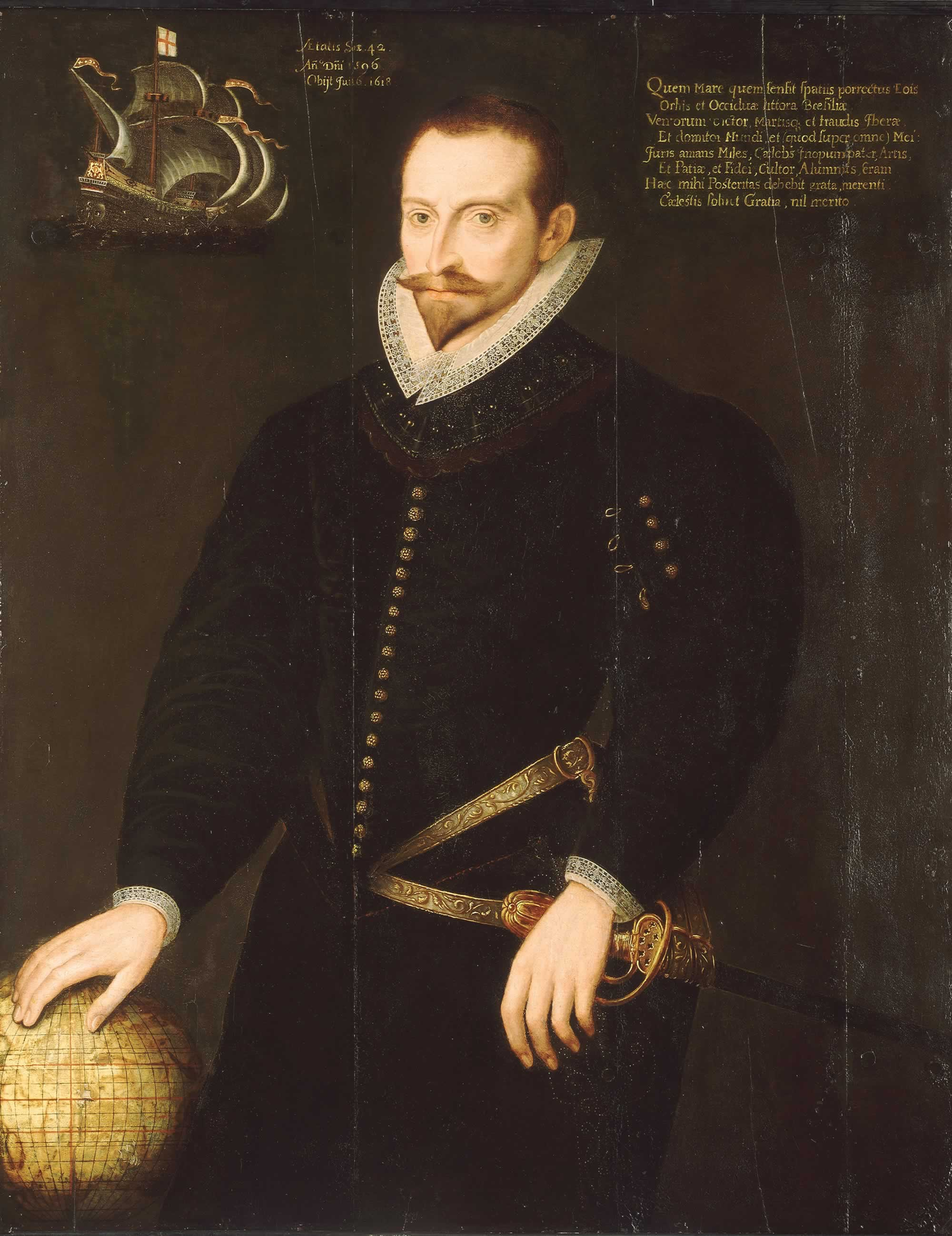
James Lancaster commanded the first East India Company voyage in 1601.

Sir James Lancaster commanded the first East India Company voyage in 1601 aboard Red Dragon. The following year, whilst sailing in the Malacca Straits, Lancaster took the rich 1,200 ton Portuguese carrack Sao Thome carrying pepper and spices. The booty enabled the voyagers to set up two "factories" (trading posts) – one at Bantam on Java and another in the Moluccas (Spice Islands) before leaving. On return to England in 1603, they learned of Elizabeth's death, but Lancaster was knighted by the new king, James I, on account of the voyage's success. By this time, the war with Spain had ended but the company had profitably breached the Spanish-Portuguese duopoly; new horizons opened for the English.

In March 1604, Sir Henry Middleton commanded the company's second voyage. General William Keeling, a captain during the second voyage, led the third voyage aboard Red Dragon from 1607 to 1610 along with Hector under Captain William Hawkins and Consent under Captain David Middleton.

Early in 1608, Alexander Sharpeigh was made captain of the company's Ascension, and general or commander of the fourth voyage. Thereafter, two ships, Ascension and Union (captained by Richard Rowles), sailed from Woolwich on 14 March 1608. This expedition was lost.

East India Company Initial expeditions
Year	Vessels	Total Invested £	Bullion sent £	Goods sent £	Ships & Provisions £	Notes
1603	3	60,450	11,160	1,142	48,140	
1606	3	58,500	17,600	7,280	28,620	
1607	2	38,000	15,000	3,400	14,600	Vessels lost
1608	1	13,700	6,000	1,700	6,000	
1609	3	82,000	28,500	21,300	32,000	
1610	4	71,581	19,200	10,081	42,500	
1611	4	76,355	17,675	10,000	48,700	
1612	1	7,200	1,250	650	5,300	
1613	8	272,544	18,810	12,446		
1614	8	272,544	13,942	23,000		
1615	6	272,544	26,660	26,065		
1616	7	272,544	52,087	16,506		

Initially, the company struggled in the spice trade because of competition from the Dutch East India Company. This rivalry led to military skirmishes, with each company establishing fortified trading posts, fleets, and alliances with local rulers. The Dutch, better financed and supported by their government, gained the upper hand by establishing a stronghold in the spice islands (now Indonesia), enforcing a near-monopoly through aggressive policies that eventually drove the EIC to seek trade opportunities in India instead. The English company opened a factory (trading post) in Bantam on Java on its first voyage, and imports of pepper from Java remained an important part of the company's trade for twenty years.

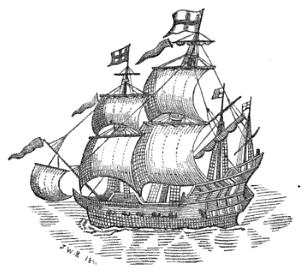
Red Dragon fought the Portuguese at the Battle of Swally in 1612, and made several voyages to the East Indies.

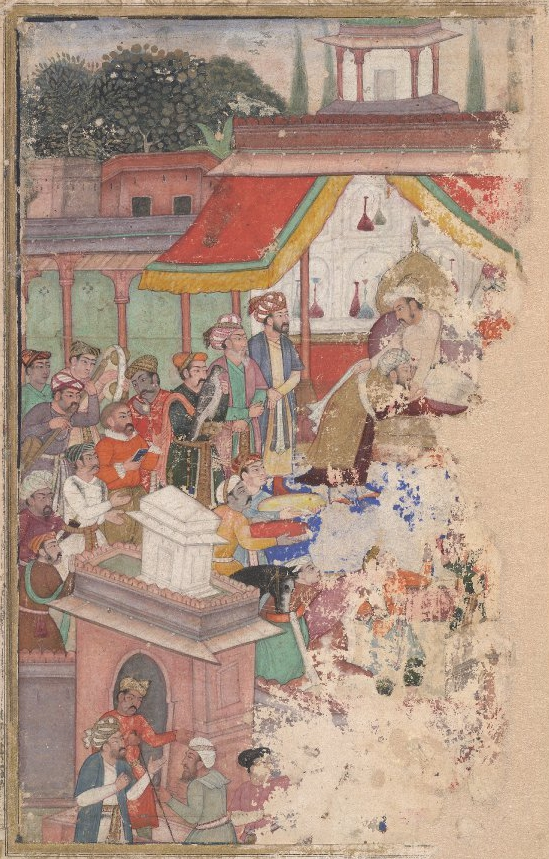
The emperor Jahangir investing a courtier with a robe of honour, watched by Sir Thomas Roe, English ambassador to the court of Jahangir at Agra from 1615 to 1618, and others

English traders frequently fought their Dutch and Portuguese counterparts in the Indian Ocean. The company achieved a major victory over the Portuguese in the Battle of Swally in 1612, at Suvali in Surat. The company decided to explore the feasibility of a foothold in mainland India, with official sanction from both Britain and the Mughal Empire, and requested that the Crown launch a diplomatic mission.

==== Foothold in India ====
Company ships docked at Surat in Gujarat in 1608. The company's first temporary factory on Indian soil was established in 1605 at Masulipatnam on the Andhra Coast of the Bay of Bengal, and its First Permanent Factory was established in 1613 at Surat. The high profits reported by the company after landing in India initially prompted James I to grant subsidiary licences to other trading companies in England. However, in 1609, he renewed the East India Company's charter for an indefinite period, with the proviso that its privileges would be annulled if trade was unprofitable for three consecutive years.

In 1615, James I instructed Sir Thomas Roe to visit the Mughal Emperor Nur-ud-din Salim Jahangir (r. 1605–1627) to arrange for a commercial treaty that would give the company exclusive rights to reside and establish factories in Surat and other areas. In return, the company offered to provide the Emperor with goods and rarities from the European market. This mission was highly successful, and Jahangir sent a letter to James through Sir Thomas Roe:

Upon which assurance of your royal love I have given my general command to all the kingdoms and ports of my dominions to receive all the merchants of the English nation as the subjects of my friend; that in what place soever they choose to live, they may have free liberty without any restraint; and at what port soever they shall arrive, that neither Portugal nor any other shall dare to molest their quiet; and in what city soever they shall have residence, I have commanded all my governors and captains to give them freedom answerable to their own desires; to sell, buy, and to transport into their country at their pleasure. For confirmation of our love and friendship, I desire your Majesty to command your merchants to bring in their ships of all sorts of rarities and rich goods fit for my palace; and that you be pleased to send me your royal letters by every opportunity, that I may rejoice in your health and prosperous affairs; that our friendship may be interchanged and eternal.

— Nuruddin Salim Jahangir, Letter to James I.

==== Expansion in present-day South Asia ====
The company, which benefited from imperial patronage, soon expanded its commercial trading operations. It eclipsed the Portuguese Estado da Índia, which had established bases in Goa, Chittagong, and Bombay; Portugal later ceded Bombay to England as part of the dowry of Catherine of Braganza on her marriage to King Charles II. The East India Company also launched a joint attack with the Dutch United East India Company (VOC) on Portuguese and Spanish ships off the coast of China that helped secure EIC ports in China, independently attacking the Portuguese in the Persian Gulf Residencies primarily for political reasons. The company established trading posts in Surat (1619) and Madras (1639). By 1647, the company had 23 factories and settlements in India, and 90 employees. Many of the major factories became some of the most populated and commercially influential cities in Bengal, including the walled forts of Fort William in Bengal, Fort St George in Madras, and Bombay Castle.

The first century of the Company, despite its original profits coming primarily from piracy in the Spice Islands between competing European powers and their companies, saw the East India Company change focus after suffering a major setback in 1623 when their factory in Amboyna in the Moluccas was attacked by the Dutch. This compelled the company to formally abandon their efforts in the Spice Islands, and turn their attention to Bengal where, by this time, they were making steady, if less exciting, profits. After gaining the indifferent patronage of the Mughal Empire, whose cities were "the megacities of their time" and whose wealth was unrivalled outside of Asia in the 17th century, the Company's first century in the Mughal-ruled areas was spent cultivating their relationship with the Mughal Dynasty, and conducting peaceful trade at great profit. At first, it should be said the EIC was drawn into the Mughal system, acting as a kind of vassal to Mughal authority in present-day Bangladesh: it was from this position that the Company would ultimately outplay and outmanoeuvre all competing powers in the region, to eventually use that very system to hold power itself.

What started as trading posts on undesirable land were developed into sprawling factory complexes with hundreds of workers sending exotic goods to England and managing protected points to export English finished goods to local merchants. The Company's initial rise in Bengal and successes generally came at the expense of competing European powers through the art of currying favours and well-placed bribes, as the Company was matched at every step by French expansion in the region (whose equivalent company carried substantial royal support). Throughout the entire century, the company only resorted to force against the Mughals once, with terrible consequences. The Anglo-Mughal war (1686–1690) was a complete defeat, ending when the EIC effectively swore fealty to the Mughals to get their factories back. The East India Company's fortunes changed for the better in 1707 when Bengal and other regions under Mughal rule fell into anarchy after the death of the Mughal Emperor Aurangzeb. A series of large-scale rebellions, and the collapse of the Mughal taxation system led to the effective independence of virtually all of the pre-1707 Mughal fiefs and holdings, with their capital Delhi routinely under the control of Maratha, Afghan, or usurper generals' armies. The EIC was able to take advantage of this chaos, slowly assuming direct control of the province of Bengal, and fighting numerous wars against the French for control of the east coast of the subcontinent. The Company's position in the Mughal court as it fell apart made it possible to sponsor various powerful people on the subcontinent as they individually contended with others, steadily amassing more land and power in India to themselves.

In the 18th Century, the primary source of the Company's profits in Bengal became taxation in conquered and controlled provinces, as the factories became fortresses and administrative hubs for networks of tax collectors that expanded into enormous cities. The Mughal Empire was the richest in the world in 1700, and the East India Company tried to strip it bare for a century thereafter. Dalrymple calls it "the single largest transfer of wealth until the Nazis". What was in the 17th century the production capital of the world for textiles was forced to become a market for British-made textiles. Statues, jewels, and various other valuables were moved from the palaces of Bengal to the townhouses of the English countryside. Bengal in particular suffered the worst of Company tax farming, highlighted by the Great Bengal famine of 1770.

The Company found its first real territorial and financial foothold in India via the Battle of Plassey. The battle took place on 23 June 1757, when Robert Clive's force of roughly 800 soldiers and 2,200 sepoys defeated the Nawab of Bengal, Siraj ud-Daula. The company was victorious largely through a prior conspiracy with the Nawab’s commander, Mir Jafar, instead of through force. The victory installed Mir Jafar as the Nawab and secured the Company a settlement worth £3 million.

Mir Jafar's subsequent dependence on Company backing drew the Company steadily deeper into the government of Bengal, culminating in 1765 when the Mughal emperor Shah Alam II granted it the diwani, the right to collect and administer the revenues of Bengal, Bihar, and Orissa. This gave the Company a public revenue on a scale previously unmatched by any other European trading enterprise, and allowed it to pay for its exports of Bengali cloth and other goods out of local tax revenue rather than by shipping bullion from Britain, a pattern historians such as Robins have called "unrequited trade." In effect, the Company had become a territorial and fiscal power as much as a commercial one.

The primary tool of expansion for the company was the Sepoy. The Sepoys were locally raised with European training and equipment, who changed warfare in present-day South Asia. Mounted forces and their superior mobility had been king on the region's battlefields for a thousand years, with cannon so well integrated that the Mughals fought with cannon mounted on elephants; all were no match for line infantry with decent discipline supported with field cannon. Repeatedly, a few thousand company sepoys fought vastly larger Mughal forces numerically and came out victorious. Afghan, Mughal, and Maratha factions started creating their own European-style forces, often with French equipment, as the chaos intensified and the stakes were raised. Ultimately, the company won out, generally through as much diplomacy and statecraft as through fraud and deception. The gradual rise of the East India Company within the Mughal network culminated in the Second Anglo-Maratha War, in which the Company successfully ousted the Maratha, the Empire's official protectors, at the high water point in their rise to power, and installed a young Mughal Prince as Emperor, with the Company as the de jure protectors of the Empire from their position of direct control in Bengal. This relationship was repeatedly strained as the Company continued its expansion and exploitation; however, it lasted in some form until 1858, when the last Mughal Emperor was exiled as the Company was disbanded and its assets were taken over by the British Crown.

In 1634, the Mughal emperor Shah Jahan extended his hospitality to English traders to Bengal, the richest region of the empire, and in 1717 customs duties were completely waived for the English in Bengal. By then, the Company's mainstay businesses were in cotton, silk, opium, indigo dye, saltpetre and tea. Meanwhile, the Dutch, the Company's most aggressive competitors, had expanded their monopoly of the spice trade in the Straits of Malacca by ousting the Portuguese in 1640–1641. With reduced Portuguese and Spanish influence in the region, the EIC and VOC entered a period of intense competition, resulting in the Anglo-Dutch wars of the 17th and 18th centuries. The British were also interested in trans-Himalayan trade routes, as they would create access to untapped markets for British manufactured goods in Tibet and China. This economic interest was showcased by the Anglo-Nepalese war (1814–1816).

==== Expansion throughout Asia ====
Within the first two decades of the 17th century, the Dutch East India Company or Vereenigde Oostindische Compagnie (VOC) was the wealthiest commercial operation in the world with 50,000 employees worldwide and a private fleet of 200 ships. It specialised in the spice trade and gave its shareholders a 40% annual dividend. The British East India Company was fiercely competitive with the Dutch and French throughout the 17th and 18th centuries over spices from the Spice Islands. Some spices, at the time, could only be found on these islands, such as nutmeg and cloves; and they could bring profits as high as 400 per cent from one voyage. The tension was so high between the Dutch and the British East Indies Trading Companies that it escalated into at least four Anglo-Dutch wars: 1652–1654, 1665–1667, 1672–1674 and 1780–1784. Competition arose in 1635 when Charles I granted a trading licence to Sir William Courteen, which permitted the rival Courteen association to trade with the East at any location in which the EIC had no presence. In an act aimed at strengthening the power of the EIC, King Charles II granted the EIC (in a series of five acts around 1670) the rights to autonomous territorial acquisitions, to mint money, to command fortresses and troops and form alliances, to make war and peace, and to exercise both civil and criminal jurisdiction over the acquired areas.

In 1689, a Mughal fleet commanded by Sidi Yaqub attacked Bombay. After a year of resistance, the EIC surrendered in 1690, and the company sent envoys to Aurangzeb's camp to plead for a pardon. The company's envoys had to prostrate themselves before the emperor, pay a large indemnity, and promise better behaviour in the future. The emperor withdrew his troops, and the company subsequently re-established itself in Bombay and set up a new base in Calcutta.

Indian exports of textiles to Europe (pieces per year)
Years	EIC					VOC	France	EdI	Denmark	Total
Years	Bengal	Madras	Bombay	Surat	EIC (total)	VOC (total)				Total
1665–1669	7,041	37,078	95,558		139,677	126,572				266,249
1670–1674	46,510	169,052	294,959		510,521	257,918				768,439
1675–1679	66,764	193,303	309,480		569,547	127,459				697,006
1680–1684	107,669	408,032	452,083		967,784	283,456				1,251,240
1685–1689	169,595	244,065	200,766		614,426	316,167				930,593
1690–1694	59,390	23,011	89,486		171,887	156,891				328,778
1695–1699	130,910	107,909	148,704		387,523	364,613				752,136
1700–1704	197,012	104,939	296,027		597,978	310,611				908,589
1705–1709	70,594	99,038	34,382		204,014	294,886				498,900
1710–1714	260,318	150,042	164,742		575,102	372,601				947,703
1715–1719	251,585	20,049	582,108		534,188	435,923				970,111
1720–1724	341,925	269,653	184,715		796,293	475,752				1,272,045
1725–1729	558,850	142,500	119,962		821,312	399,477				1,220,789
1730–1734	583,707	86,606	57,503		727,816	241,070				968,886
1735–1739	580,458	137,233	66,981		784,672	315,543				1,100,215
1740–1744	619,309	98,252	295,139		812,700	288,050				1,100,750
1745–1749	479,593	144,553	60,042		684,188	262,261				946,449
1750–1754	406,706	169,892	55,576		632,174	532,865				1,165,039
1755–1759	307,776	106,646	55,770		470,192	321,251				791,443

==== Slavery 1621–1834 ====
The East India Company's archives suggest its involvement in the slave trade began in 1684, when a Captain Robert Knox was ordered to buy and transport 250 slaves from Madagascar to St. Helena. The East India Company began using and transporting slaves in Asia and the Atlantic in the early 1620s, according to the Encyclopædia Britannica, or in 1621, according to Richard Allen. Eventually, the company ended the trade in 1834 after numerous legal threats from the British state and the Royal Navy in the form of the West Africa Squadron, which discovered various ships had contained evidence of the illegal trade.

==== Japan ====
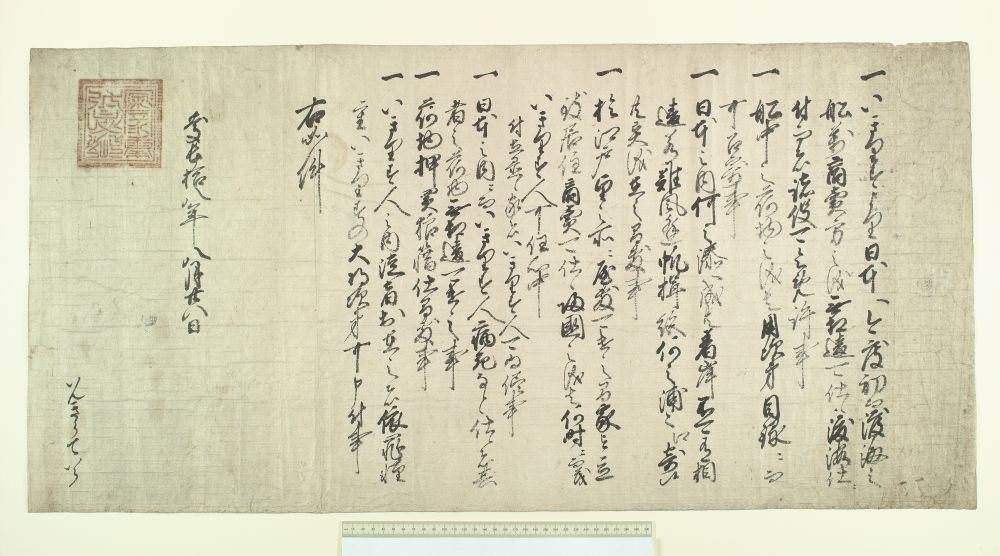
A document with the original vermilion seal of Tokugawa Ieyasu, granting trade privileges in Japan to the East India Company in 1613

In 1613, during the rule of Tokugawa Hidetada of the Tokugawa shogunate, the British ship Clove, under the command of Captain John Saris, was the first English ship to call on Japan. Saris was the chief factor of the EIC's trading post in Java, and with the assistance of William Adams, an English sailor who had arrived in Japan in 1600, he was able to gain permission from the ruler to establish a commercial house in Hirado on the Japanese island of Kyushu:

We give free license to the subjects of the King of Great Britaine, Sir Thomas Smythe, Governor and Company of the East Indian Merchants and Adventurers forever safely come into any of our ports of our Empire of Japan with their shippes and merchandise, without any hindrance to them or their goods, and to abide, buy, sell and barter according to their own manner with all nations, to tarry here as long as they think good, and to depart at their pleasure.

Unable to obtain Japanese raw silk for export to China, and with their trading area reduced to Hirado and Nagasaki from 1616 onwards, the company closed its factory in 1623.

==== Anglo-Mughal War ====
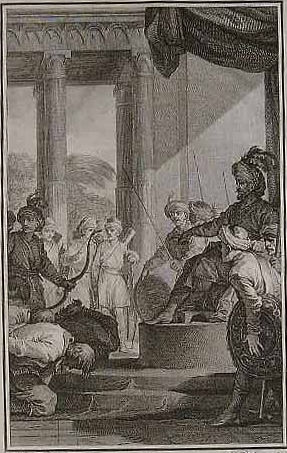
The English ask Aurangzeb, whom they have offended, for forgiveness, copperplate engraving from Histoire des deux Indes by Guillaume-Thomas Raynal, published 1780 in Geneva

The first of the Anglo-Indian wars occurred in 1686 when the company conducted naval operations against Shaista Khan, the governor of Mughal Bengal. This led to the siege of Bombay and the subsequent intervention of the Mughal Emperor, Aurangzeb. Subsequently, the English East India company was defeated and fined.

Mughal convoy piracy incident of 1695

In September 1695, Captain Henry Every, an English pirate on board the Fancy, reached the Straits of Bab-el-Mandeb, where he teamed up with five other pirate captains to attack the Indian fleet returning from the annual pilgrimage to Mecca. The Mughal convoy included the treasure-laden Ganj-i-Sawai, reported to be the greatest in the Mughal fleet and the largest ship operational in the Indian Ocean, and its escort, the Fateh Muhammed. They were spotted passing the straits en route to Surat. The pirates gave chase and caught up with the Fateh Muhammed some days later, and meeting little resistance, took some £40,000 of silver.

Every continued in pursuit and managed to overhaul Ganj-i-Sawai, which resisted strongly before eventually striking. Ganj-i-Sawai carried enormous wealth and, according to contemporary East India Company sources, was carrying a relative of the Grand Mughal, though there is no evidence to suggest that it was his daughter and her retinue. The loot from the Ganj-i-Sawai had a total value between £325,000 and £600,000, including 500,000 gold and silver pieces, and has become known as the richest ship ever taken by pirates.

When the news arrived in England, it caused an outcry. To appease Aurangzeb, the East India Company promised to pay all financial reparations, while Parliament declared the pirates hostis humani generis ("the enemy of humanity"). In mid-1696 the government issued a £500 bounty on Every's head and offered a free pardon to any informer who disclosed his whereabouts. The first worldwide manhunt in recorded history was underway.

The plunder of Aurangzeb's treasure ship had serious consequences for the English East India Company. The furious Mughal Emperor Aurangzeb ordered Sidi Yaqub and Nawab Daud Khan to attack and close four of the company's factories in India and imprison their officers, who were almost lynched by a mob of angry Mughals, blaming them for their countryman's depredations, and threatened to put an end to all English trading in India. To appease Emperor Aurangzeb and particularly his Grand Vizier Asad Khan, Parliament exempted Every from all of the Acts of Grace (pardons) and amnesties it would subsequently issue to other pirates.

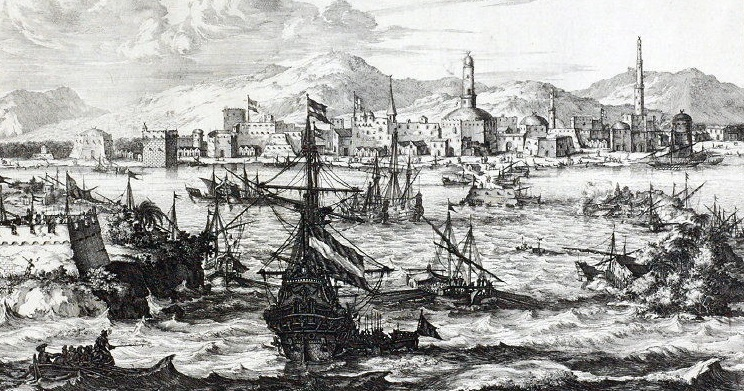
English, Dutch and Danish factories at Mokha

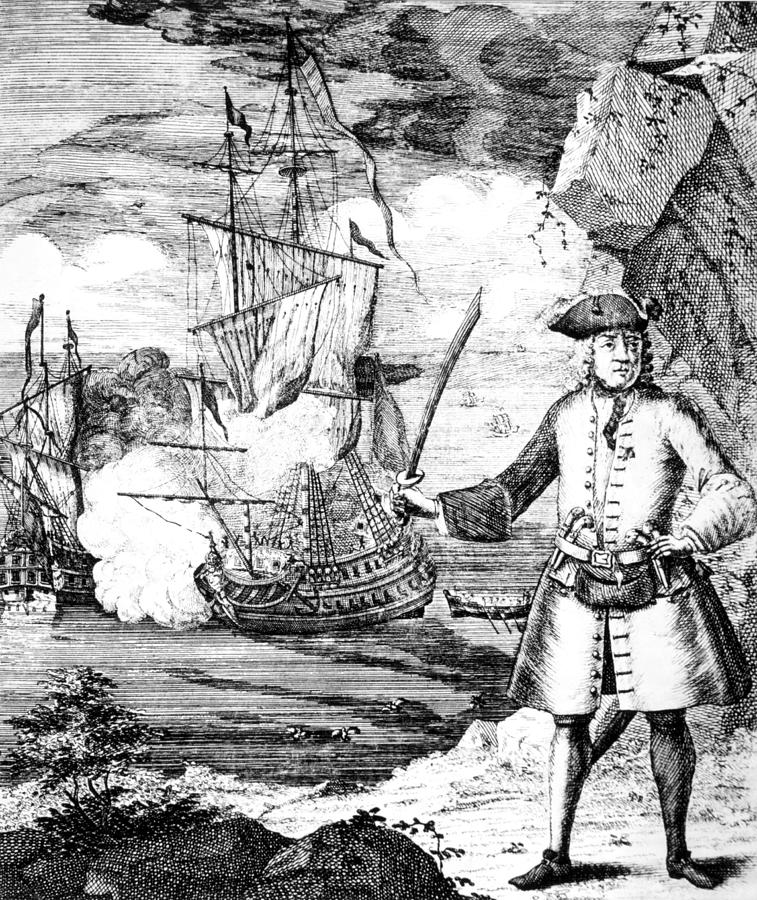
An 18th-century depiction of Henry Every, with the Fancy shown engaging its prey in the background

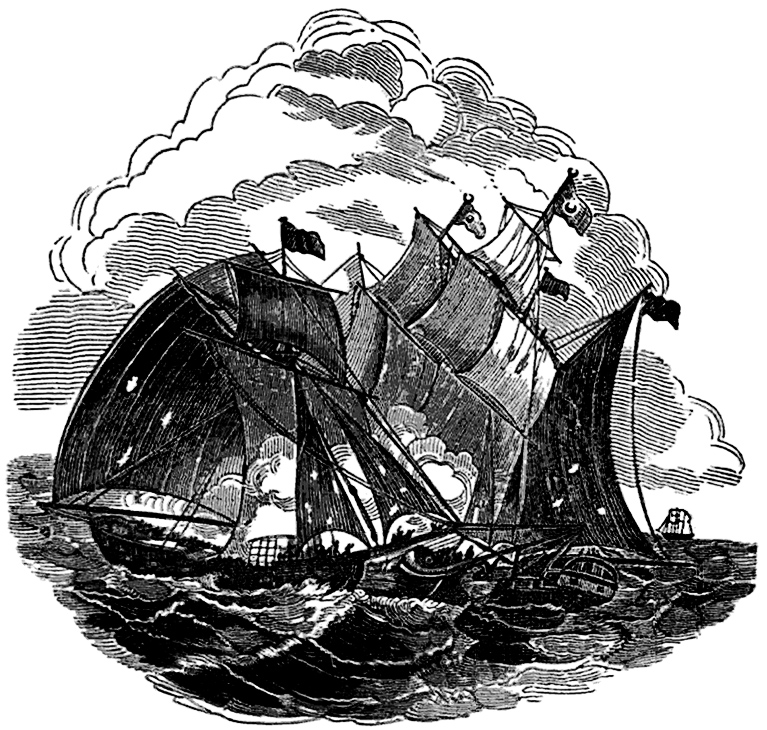
British pirates that fought during the Child's War engaging the Ganj-i-Sawai

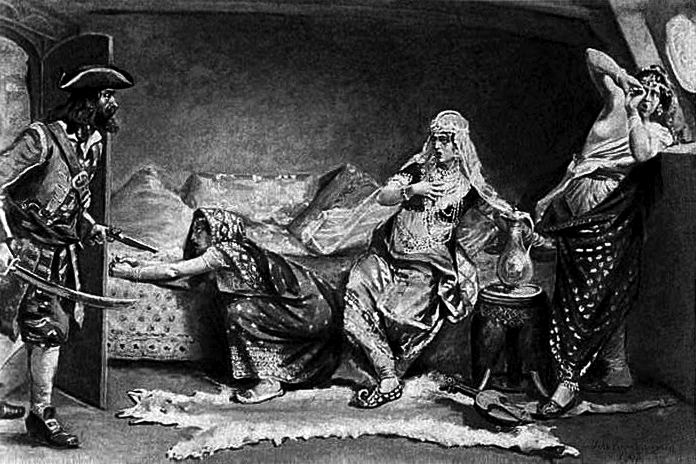
Depiction of Captain Every's encounter with the Mughal Emperor's granddaughter after his September 1695 capture of the Mughal trader Ganj-i-Sawai

==== China ====
The British began trading with China in 1699. This fact is recorded from the Chinese side in The Draft History of the Qing under the year Kangxi 37 (1698). The apparent discrepancy between the British and Chinese sources can be explained by the fact that Chinese New Year of 1699 did not fall until 31 January, so that any treaties entered into in January would have been logged under Kangxi 37 rather than Kangxi 38. In 1715 the Company established a permanent "factory" in Guangzhou (Canton).

The company started selling opium to Chinese merchants in the 1770s in exchange for goods like porcelain and tea, causing a series of opioid addiction outbreaks across China in 1820. The ruling Qing dynasty outlawed the opium trade in 1796 and 1800, but British merchants continued illegally nonetheless. The Qing took measures to prevent the East India Company from selling opium, and destroyed tens of thousands of chests of opium already in the country. This series of events led to the First Opium War in 1839, which involved a succession of British naval attacks along the Chinese coast over the course of several months. As part of the Treaty of Nanjing in 1842, the Qing were forced to give British merchants special treatment and the right to sell opium. The Chinese also ceded territory to the British, including the island of Hong Kong.

Within India, opium was grown for export by peasant farmers in the north in what are now Uttar Pradesh and Bihar, under a monopoly run through an Opium Agency of clerks who enforced contracts and quality standards. According to the economic historian Rolf Bauer farmers received less for their raw opium than it cost to grow and the system relied on advance payments, production targets and coercion. The Company's opium trade was exploitative and left millions of Indian farmers impoverished.

=== Forming a monopoly ===
==== Trade monopoly ====
The prosperity that the officers of the company enjoyed allowed them to return to Britain and establish sprawling estates and businesses, and to obtain political power, such as seats in the House of Commons. Ship captains sold their appointments to successors for up to £500. As recruits aimed to return to Britain wealthy by securing Indian money, their loyalties to their homeland increased.

The company developed a lobby in the English parliament. Pressure from ambitious tradesmen and former company associates (pejoratively termed Interlopers by the company), who wanted to establish private trading firms in India, led to the passing of the deregulating act in 1694.

East India Company Act 1697
- Act of Parliament
- Parliament of England
- Long title: An Act for raising a Sum not exceeding Two Millions upon a Fund for Payment of Annuities after the Rate of Eight Pounds per Cent. per Annum; and for settling the Trade to the East Indies.
- Citation: 9 Will 3. c. 44 (Note: This is the citation in The Statutes of the Realm.); 9 & 10 Will. 3. c. 44 (Note: This is the citation in The Statutes at Large.)
- Territorial extent: England and Wales

Dates
- Royal assent: 5 July 1698
- Commencement: 3 December 1697 (Note: Start of session.)
- Repealed: 20 June 1892
Other legislation
Amended by	Statute Law Revision Act 1871; Statute Law Revision Act 1888
Repealed by	Statute Law Revision Act 1892

Status: Repealed

Text of statute as originally enacted

This act allowed any English firm to trade with India, unless specifically prohibited by an Act of Parliament, thereby annulling the charter that had been in force for almost 100 years. When the East India Company Act 1697 (9 Will. 3. c. 44) was passed in 1697, a new "parallel" East India Company (officially titled the English Company Trading to the East Indies) was floated under a state-backed indemnity of £2 million. The powerful stockholders of the old company quickly subscribed a sum of £315,000 in the new concern, and dominated the new body. The two companies wrestled with each other for some time, both in England and in India, for a dominant share of the trade.

It quickly became evident that, in practice, the original company faced scarcely any measurable competition. The companies merged in 1708, by a tripartite indenture involving both companies and the state, with the charter and agreement for the new United Company of Merchants of England Trading to the East Indies being awarded by Sidney Godolphin, 1st Earl of Godolphin. Under this arrangement, the merged company lent a sum of £3,200,000 to the Treasury, in return for exclusive privileges for the next three years, after which the situation was to be reviewed.

East India Company Act 1711
- Act of Parliament
- Parliament of Great Britain
- Long title: An Act for continuing the Trade and Corporation-capacity of the United East India Company, although their Fund should be redeemed.
- Citation: 10 Ann. c. 35; 10 Ann. c. 28
- Territorial extent: Great Britain

Dates
- Royal assent: 21 June 1712
- Commencement: 7 December 1711
- Repealed: 15 July 1867
Other legislation
Repealed by	Statute Law Revision Act 1867
Relates to	East India Company Act 1707

Status: Repealed

Text of statute as originally enacted

A constant battle between the company lobby and Parliament followed for decades. The company sought a permanent establishment, while Parliament would not willingly allow it greater autonomy and so relinquish the opportunity to exploit the company's profits. In 1712, the East India Company Act 1711 was passed, which renewed the status of the company, though the debts were repaid. By 1720, 15% of British imports were from India, almost all passing through the company, which reasserted the influence of the company lobby. The licence was prolonged until 1766 by yet another act in 1730.

At this time, Britain and France became bitter rivals. Frequent skirmishes between them took place for control of colonial possessions. In 1742, fearing the monetary consequences of a war, the British government agreed to extend the deadline for the licensed exclusive trade by the company in India until 1783, in return for a further loan of £1 million. Between 1756 and 1763, the Seven Years' War diverted the state's attention towards consolidation and defence of its territorial possessions in Europe and its colonies in North America.

The war partly took place in the Indian theatre, between the company troops and the French forces. In 1757, the Law Officers of the Crown delivered the Pratt–Yorke opinion distinguishing overseas territories acquired by right of conquest from those acquired by private treaty. The opinion asserted that, while the Crown of Great Britain enjoyed sovereignty over both, only the property of the former was vested in the Crown. With the advent of the Industrial Revolution, Britain surged ahead of its European rivals. Demand for Indian commodities was boosted by the need to sustain troops and the economy during the war, and by the increased availability of raw materials and efficient methods of production. As home to the revolution, Britain experienced higher standards of living. Its ever-growing cycle of prosperity, demand and production had a profound influence on overseas trade. The company became the single largest player in the British global market. In 1801 Henry Dundas reported to the House of Commons that

... on the 1st March, 1801, the debts of the East India Company amounted to 5,393,989l. their effects to 15,404,736l. and that their sales had increased since February 1793, from 4,988,300l. to 7,602,041l.

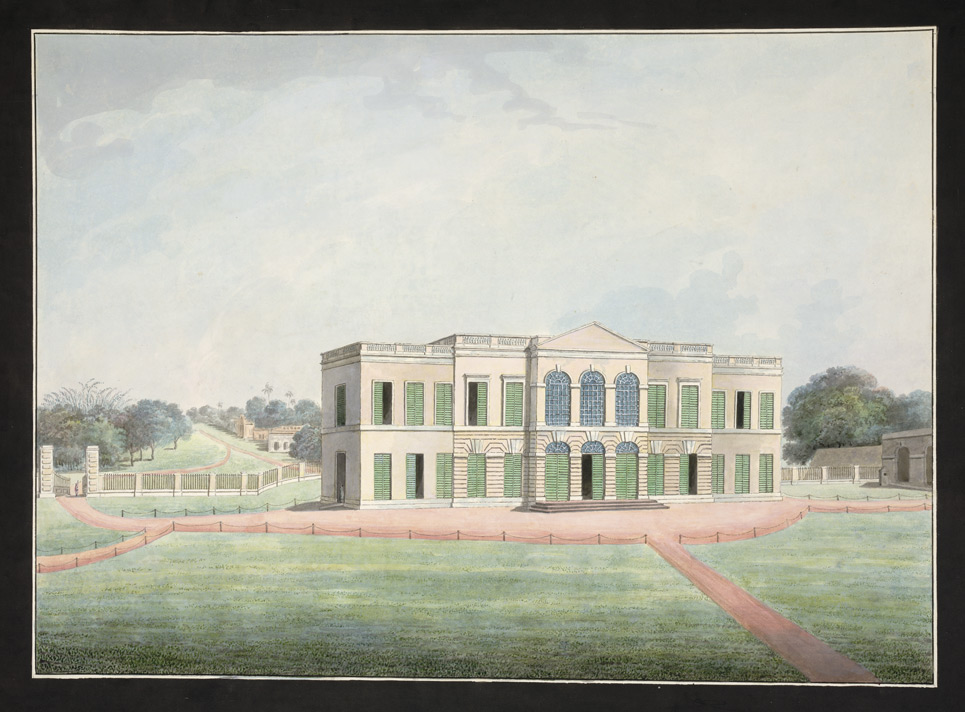
Rear view of the East India Company's factory at Cossimbazar

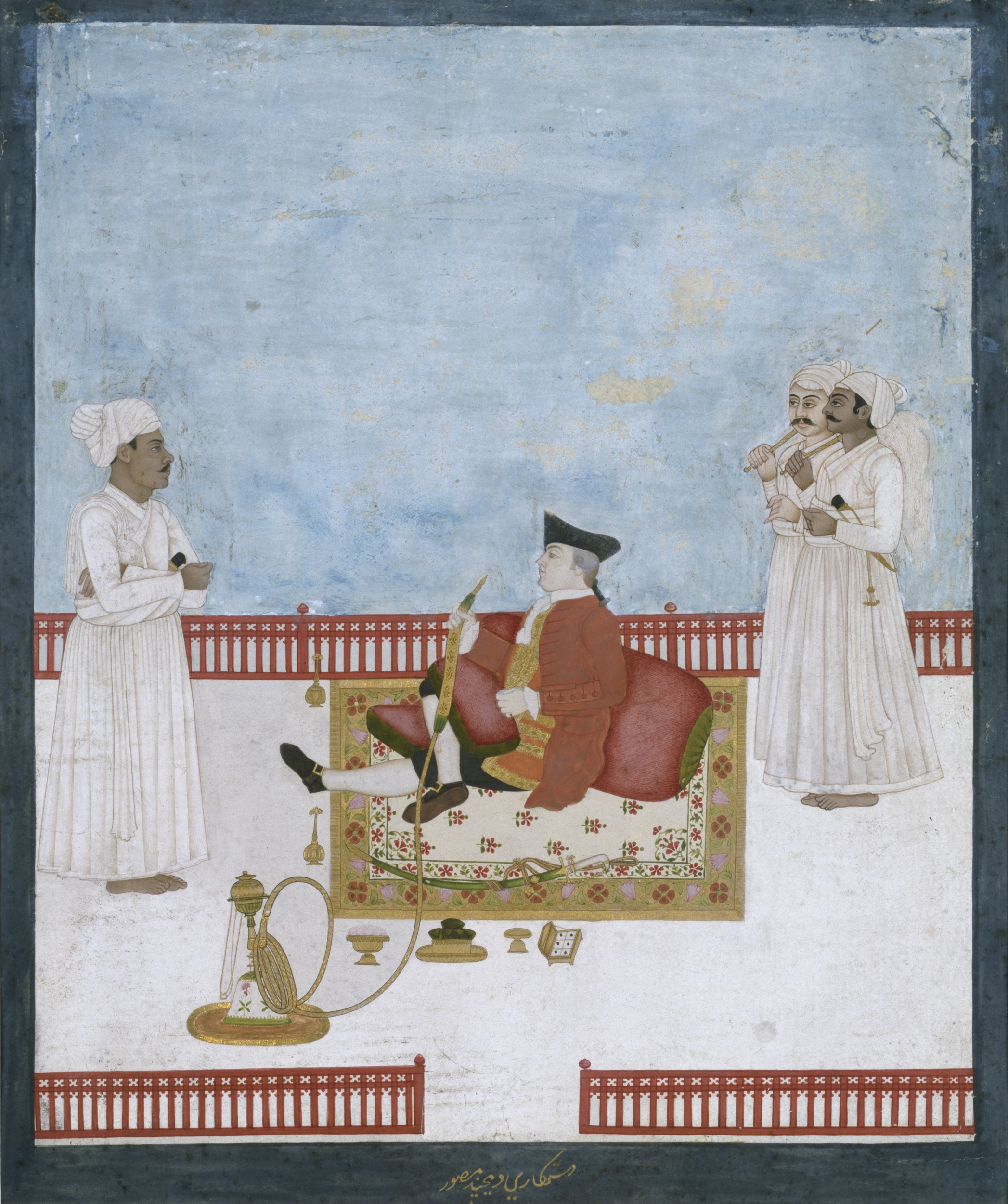
Company painting depicting an official of the East India Company, c. 1760

==== Saltpetre trade ====
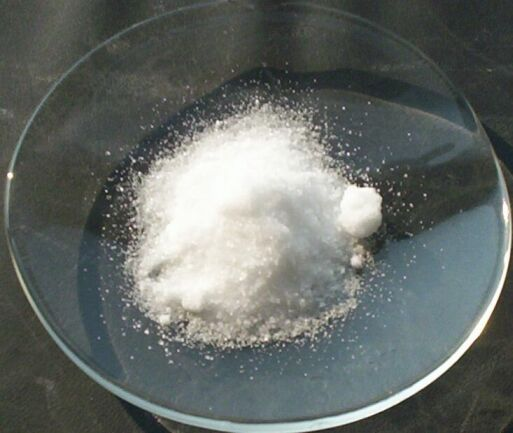
Saltpetre used for gunpowder was one of the major trade goods of the company.

Sir John Banks, a businessman from Kent who negotiated an agreement between the king and the company, began his career in a syndicate arranging contracts for victualling the navy, an interest he kept up for most of his life. He knew that Samuel Pepys and John Evelyn had amassed a substantial fortune from the Levant and Indian trades. He became a director and later, as governor of the East India Company in 1672, he arranged a contract which included a loan of £20,000 and £30,000 worth of saltpetre—also known as potassium nitrate, a primary ingredient in gunpowder—for the King "at the price it shall sell by the candle"—that is by auction—where bidding could continue as long as an inch-long candle remained alight.

Outstanding debts were also agreed, and the company was permitted to export 250 tons of saltpetre. Again in 1673, Banks successfully negotiated another contract for 700 tons of saltpetre at £37,000 between the king and the company. So high was the demand from armed forces that the authorities sometimes turned a blind eye to the untaxed sales. One governor of the company was even reported as saying in 1864 that he would rather have the saltpetre made than the tax on salt.

=== Basis for the monopoly ===
==== Colonial monopoly ====
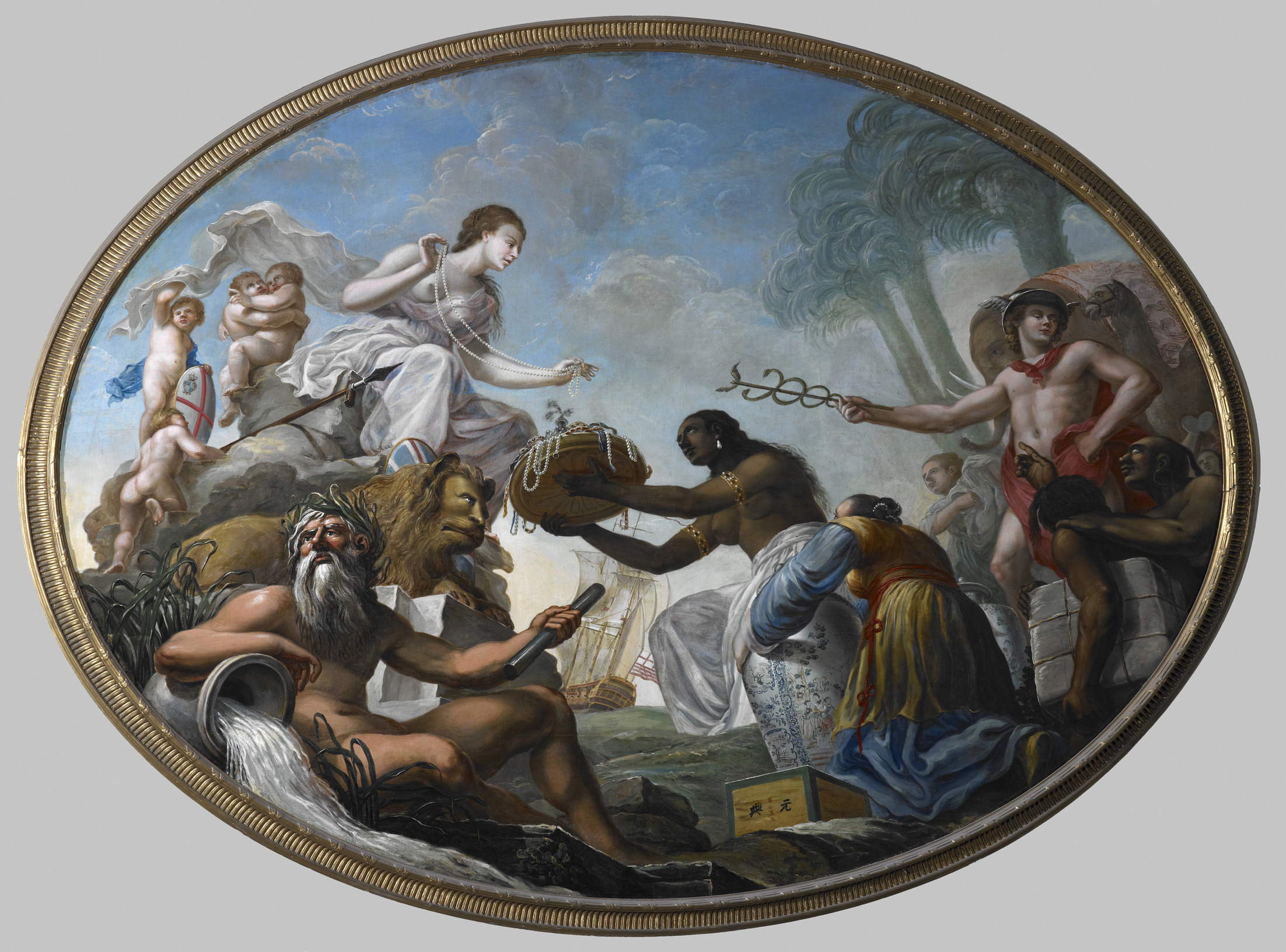
The East Offering its Riches to Britannia by Spiridione Roma, 1778

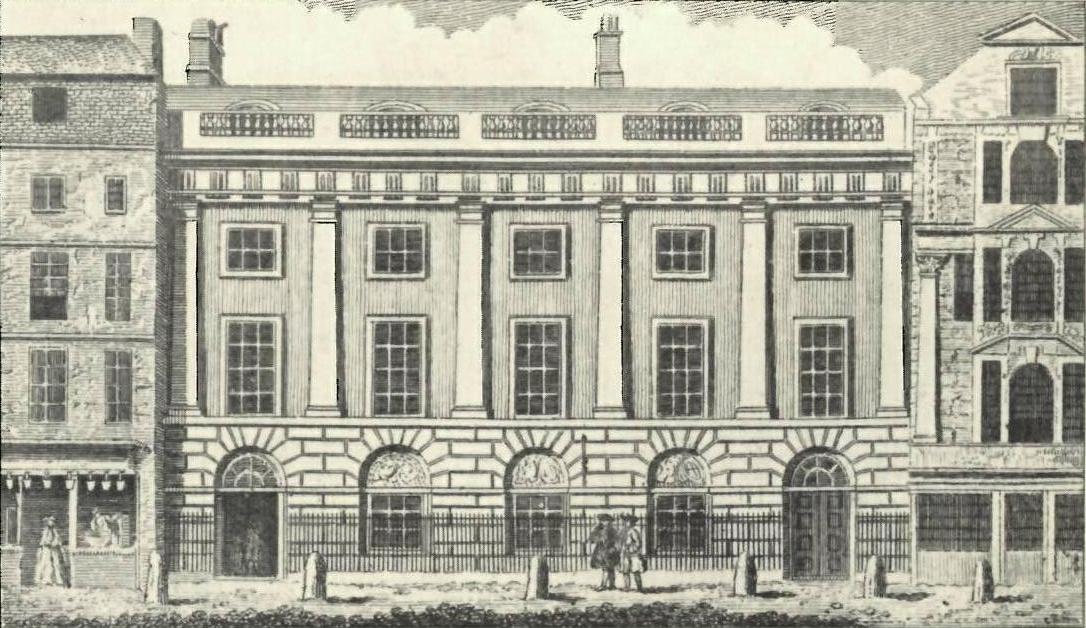
An engraving of East India House, in Leadenhall Street in the City of London (1766)

The Seven Years' War (1756–1763) resulted in the defeat of the French forces, limited French imperial ambitions, and stunted the influence of the Industrial Revolution in French territories. Robert Clive, the Governor-General, led the company to a victory against Joseph François Dupleix, the commander of the French forces in India, and recaptured Fort St George from the French. The company took this respite to seize Manila in 1762.

By the Treaty of Paris, France regained the five establishments captured by the British during the war (Pondichéry, Mahe, Karaikal, Yanam and Chandernagar) but was prevented from erecting fortifications and keeping troops in Bengal (art. XI). Elsewhere in India, the French were to remain a military threat, particularly during the War of American Independence, and up to the capture of Pondichéry in 1793 at the outset of the French Revolutionary Wars without any military presence. Although these small outposts remained French possessions for the next two hundred years, French ambitions on Indian territories were effectively laid to rest, thus eliminating a major source of economic competition for the company.

In May 1772 the EIC stock price rose significantly. In June Alexander Fordyce lost £300,000 shorting EIC stock, leaving his partners liable for an estimated £243,000 in debts. As this information became public, 20–30 banks across Europe collapsed during the British credit crisis of 1772–1773. In India alone, the company had bill debts of £1.2 million. It seems that EIC directors James Cockburn and George Colebrooke were "bulling" the Amsterdam market during 1772. The root of this crisis in relation to the East India Company came from the prediction by Isaac de Pinto that "peace conditions plus an abundance of money would push East Indian shares to exorbitant heights".

In September the company took out a loan from the Bank of England, to be repaid from the sale of goods later that month. But with buyers scarce, most of the sale had to be postponed, and when the loan fell due, the company's coffers were empty. On October 29, the bank refused to renew the loan. That decision set in motion a chain of events that made the American Revolution inevitable. The East India Company had eighteen million pounds of tea sitting in British warehouses. A huge amount of tea as assets which were lying unsold. Selling it in a hurry would do wonders for its finances.

On 14 January 1773, the directors of the EIC asked for a government loan and unlimited access to the tea market in the American colonies, both of which were granted. In August 1773, the Bank of England assisted the EIC with a loan. The East India Company had also been granted competitive advantages over colonial American tea importers to sell tea from its colonies in Asia in the American colonies.

This led to the Boston Tea Party on 16 December 1773, in which protesters boarded British ships and threw the tea overboard. When protesters successfully prevented the unloading of tea in three other colonies and in Boston, British loyalist Governor Thomas Hutchinson of the Province of Massachusetts Bay refused to allow the tea to be returned to Britain. This was one of the incidents which led to the American Revolution and independence of the American colonies. The company's trade monopoly with India was abolished in the Charter Act 1813. The monopoly with China was ended by the Saint Helena Act 1833 (3 & 4 Will. 4. c. 85), ending the trading activities of the company and rendering its activities purely administrative.

=== Disestablishment ===
In the aftermath of the Indian Rebellion of 1857 and under the provisions of the Government of India Act 1858, the British Government nationalised the company. The British government took over its Indian possessions, its administrative powers and machinery, and its armed forces.

The company had already divested itself of its commercial trading assets in India in favour of the UK government in 1833, with the latter assuming the debts and obligations of the company, which were to be serviced and paid from tax revenue raised in India. In return, the shareholders voted to accept an annual dividend of 10.5%, guaranteed for forty years, likewise to be funded from India, with a final pay-off to redeem outstanding shares. The debt obligations continued beyond dissolution and were only extinguished by the UK government during the Second World War.

The company remained in existence in vestigial form, continuing to manage the tea trade on behalf of the British Government (and the supply of Saint Helena) until the East India Stock Dividend Redemption Act 1873 came into effect, on 1 January 1874. This act provided for the formal dissolution of the company on 1 June 1874, after a final dividend payment and the commutation or redemption of its stock. The Times commented on 8 April 1873:

It accomplished a work such as in the whole history of the human race no other trading Company ever attempted, and such as none, surely, is likely to attempt in the years to come.

== Establishments in the United Kingdom ==
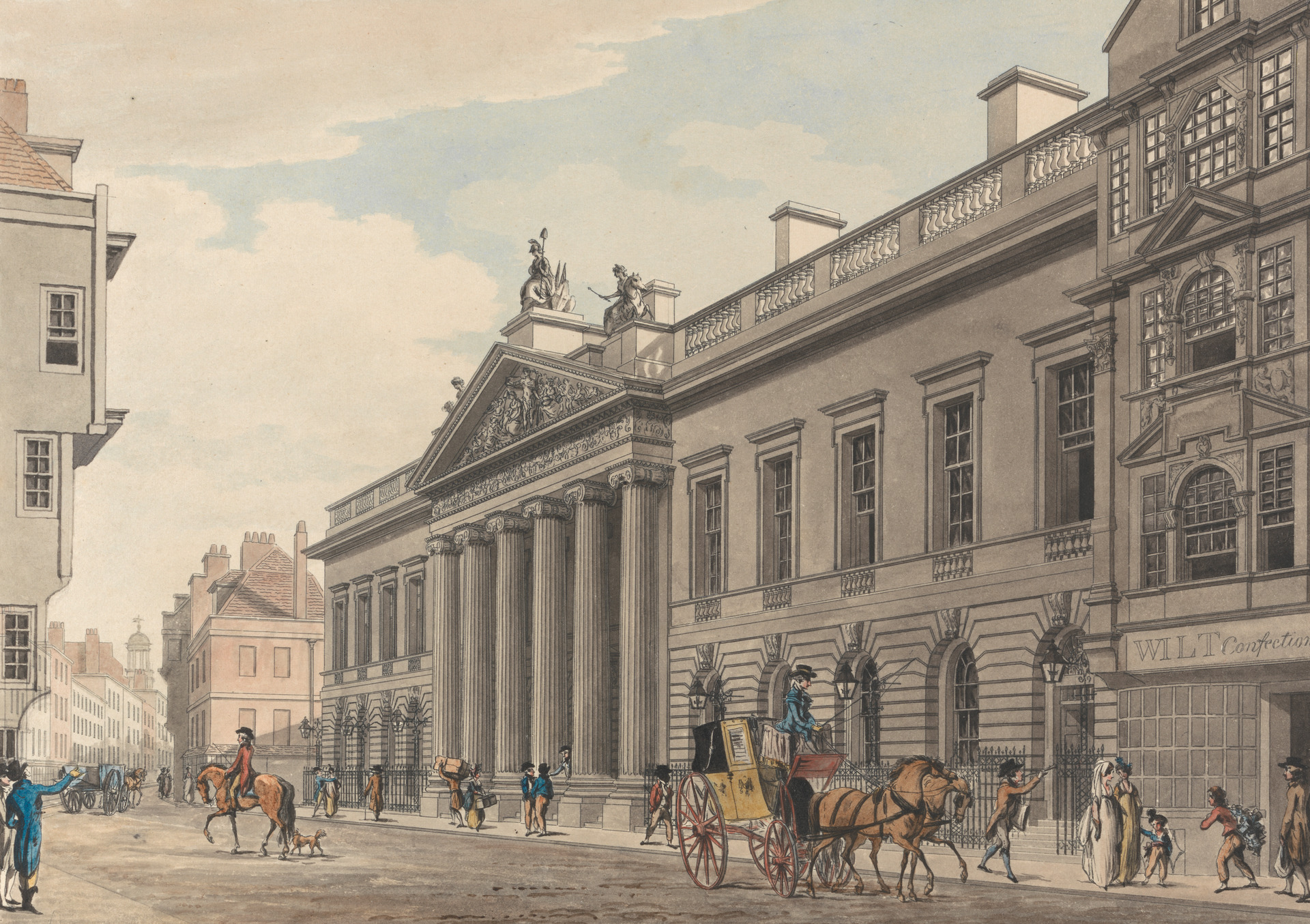
The expanded East India House, London, painted by Thomas Malton, c. 1800

The company's headquarters in London, from which much of India was governed, was East India House in Leadenhall Street. After occupying premises in Philpot Lane from 1600 to 1621; in Crosby House, Bishopsgate from 1621 to 1638; and in Leadenhall Street from 1638 to 1648, the company moved into Craven House, an Elizabethan mansion in Leadenhall Street. The building had become known as East India House by 1661. It was completely rebuilt and enlarged in 1726–1729 and further significantly remodelled and expanded in 1796–1800. It was finally vacated in 1860 and demolished in 1861–1862. The site is now occupied by the Lloyd's building.

In 1607, the company decided to build its own ships and leased a yard on the River Thames at Deptford. By 1614, the yard having become too small, an alternative site was acquired at Blackwall: the new yard was fully operational by 1617. It was sold in 1656, although for some years East India Company ships continued to be built and repaired there under the new owners. The East India Docks Act 1803 (43 Geo. 3. c. cxxvi), promoted by the East India Company, established the East India Dock Company to establish a new set of docks (the East India Docks) primarily for the use of ships trading with India. The existing Brunswick Dock, part of the Blackwall Yard site, became the Export Dock; while a new Import Dock was built to the north. In 1838 the East India Dock Company merged with the West India Dock Company. The docks were taken over by the Port of London Authority in 1909 and closed in 1967.

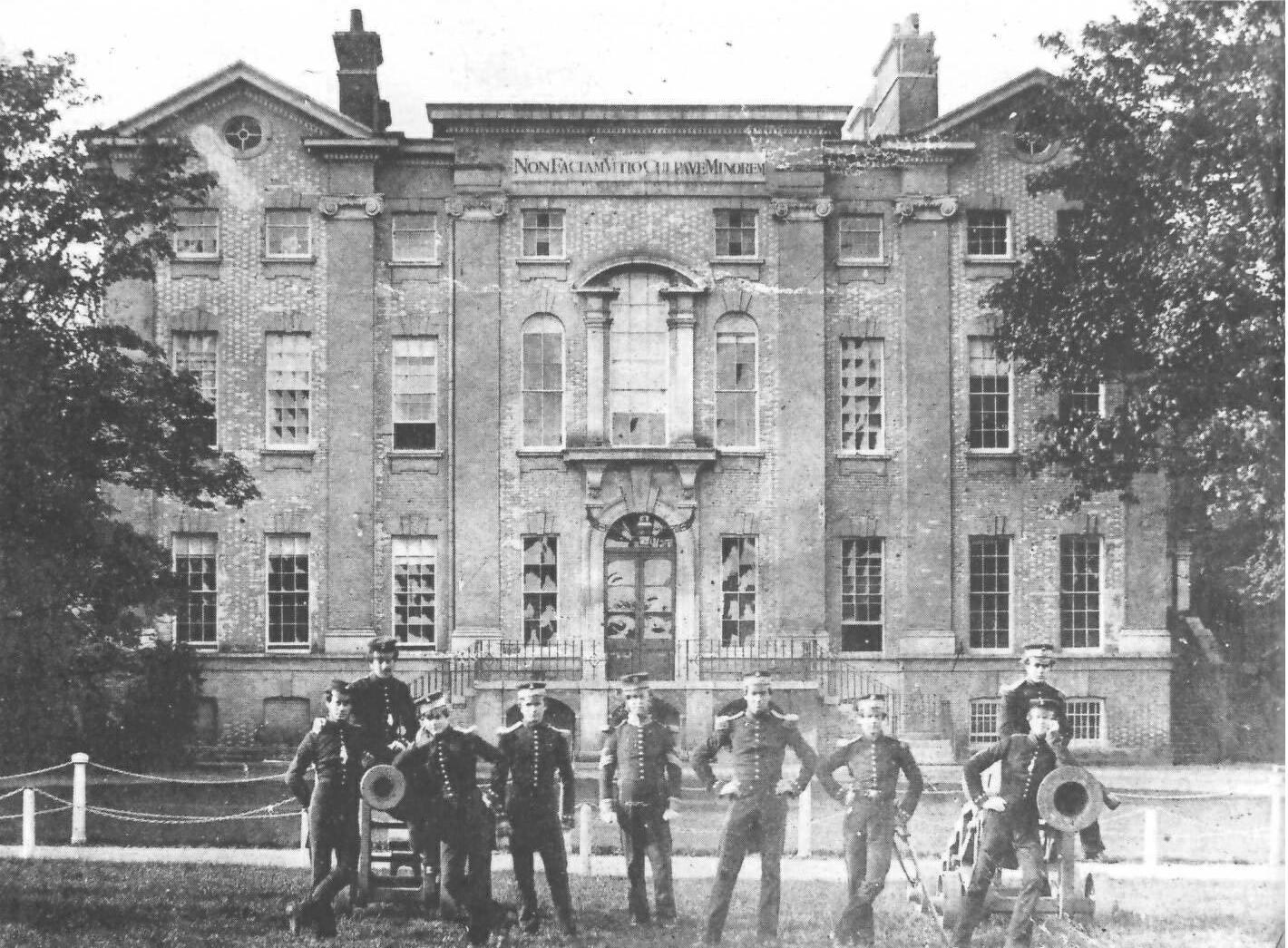
Addiscombe Seminary, photographed in c. 1859, with cadets in the foreground

The East India College was founded in 1806 as a training establishment for "writers" (i.e. clerks) in the company's service. It was initially located in Hertford Castle, but moved in 1809 to purpose-built premises at Hertford Heath, Hertfordshire. In 1858 the college closed; but in 1862 the buildings reopened as a public school, now Haileybury and Imperial Service College.

The East India Company Military Seminary was founded in 1809 at Addiscombe, near Croydon, Surrey, to train young officers for service in the company's armies in India. It was based in Addiscombe Place, an early 18th-century mansion. The government took it over in 1858 and renamed it the Royal Indian Military College. In 1861 it was closed, and the site was subsequently redeveloped.

In 1818, the company entered into an agreement by which those of its servants who were certified insane in India might be cared for at Pembroke House, Hackney, London, a private lunatic asylum run by Dr George Rees until 1838, and thereafter by Dr William Williams. The arrangement outlasted the company itself, continuing until 1870, when the India Office opened its own asylum, the Royal India Asylum, at Hanwell, Middlesex.

The East India Club in London was formed in 1849 for officers of the company. The Club still exists today as a private gentlemen's club with its club house situated at 16 St James's Square, London.

== Symbols ==
=== Flags ===
Historical depictions

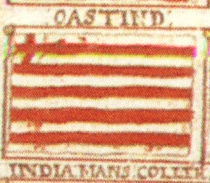
Downman (1685)

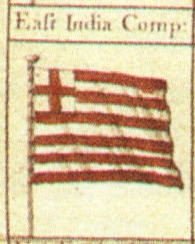
Lens (1700)

National Geographic (1917)

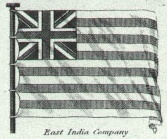
Rees (1820)

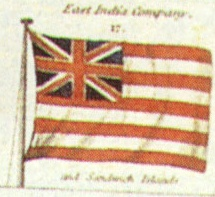
Laurie (1842)
Modern depictions

1600–1707

1707–1801

1801–1874

The English East India Company flag changed over time, with a canton based on the flag of the contemporary Kingdom, and a field of 9-to-13 alternating red and white stripes.

From 1600, the canton consisted of a St George's Cross representing the Kingdom of England. With the Acts of Union 1707, the canton was changed to the new Union Flag—consisting of an English St George's Cross combined with a Scottish St Andrew's cross—representing the Kingdom of Great Britain. After the Acts of Union 1800 that joined Ireland with Great Britain to form the United Kingdom of Great Britain and Ireland, the canton of the East India Company flag was altered accordingly to include a Saint Patrick's Saltire. There has been much debate about the number and order of stripes in the field of the flag. Historical documents and paintings show variations from 9-to-13 stripes, with some images showing the top stripe red and others showing it white. At the time of the American Revolution, the East India Company flag was nearly identical to the Continental Union Flag. Historian Charles Fawcett argued that the East India Company Flag inspired the Stars and Stripes of America.

=== Coat of arms ===
The original coat of arms of the East India Company (1600)

The later coat of arms of the East India Company (1698)

The East India Company's original coat of arms was granted in 1600. The blazon of the arms is as follows:

Arms: "Azure, three ships with three masts, rigged and under full sail, the sails, pennants and ensigns Argent, each charged with a cross Gules; on a chief of the second a pale quarterly Azure and Gules, on the 1st and 4th a fleur-de-lis or, on the 2nd and 3rd a leopard or, between two roses Gules seeded Or barbed Vert."

Crest: "A sphere without a frame, bounded with the Zodiac in bend Or, between two pennants flottant Argent, each charged with a cross Gules, over the sphere the words Deus indicat (Latin: God Indicates)."

Supporters: "Two sea lions Or, the tails proper."

Motto: Deo ducente nil nocet (Latin: "Where God Leads, Nothing Harms")

The East India Company's later arms, granted in 1698, were:

Arms: "Argent a cross Gules; in the dexter chief quarter an escutcheon of the arms of France and England quarterly, the shield ornamentally and regally crowned Or."

Crest: "A lion rampant guardant Or holding between the forepaws a regal crown proper."
Supporters: "Two lions rampant guardant Or, each supporting a banner erect Argent, charged with a cross Gules."

Motto: Auspicio regis et senatus angliæ (Latin: "Under the auspices of the King and the Parliament of England").

=== Merchant mark ===
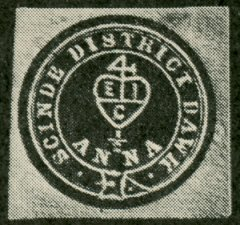
HEIC Merchant's mark on a Blue Scinde Dawk postage stamp (1852)

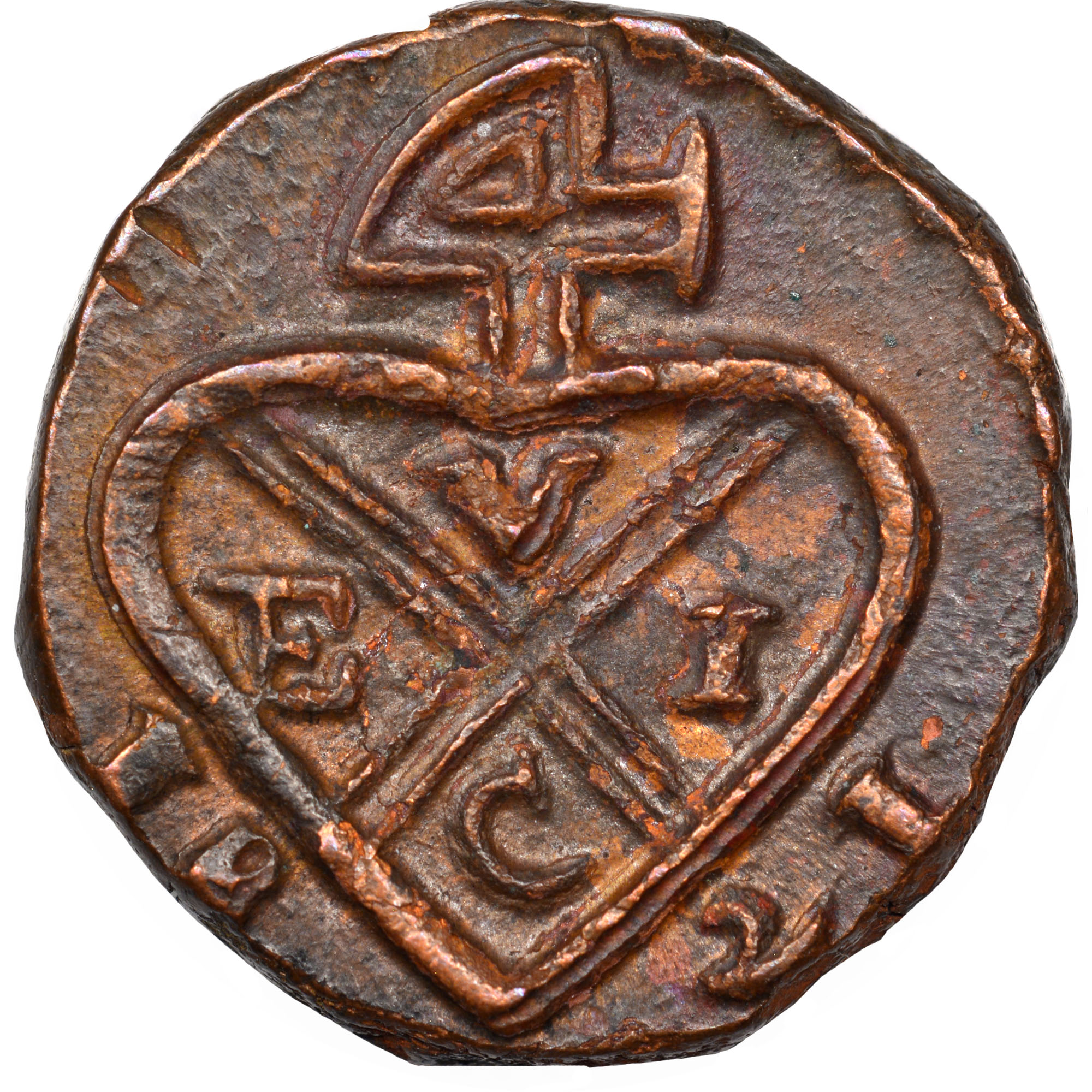
1 Pice (1/64 Rupee) copper coin of the Bombay Presidency with bale mark (1821)

When the East India Company was chartered in 1600, it was still customary for individual merchants or members of companies such as the Company of Merchant Adventurers to have a distinguishing merchant's mark which often included the mystical Sign of Four and served as a trademark. The East India Company's merchant mark consisted of a Sign of Four atop a heart within which was a saltire between the lower arms of which were the initials "EIC". This mark was a central motif of the East India Company's coinage and forms the central emblem displayed on the Scinde Dawk postage stamps.

== Ships ==
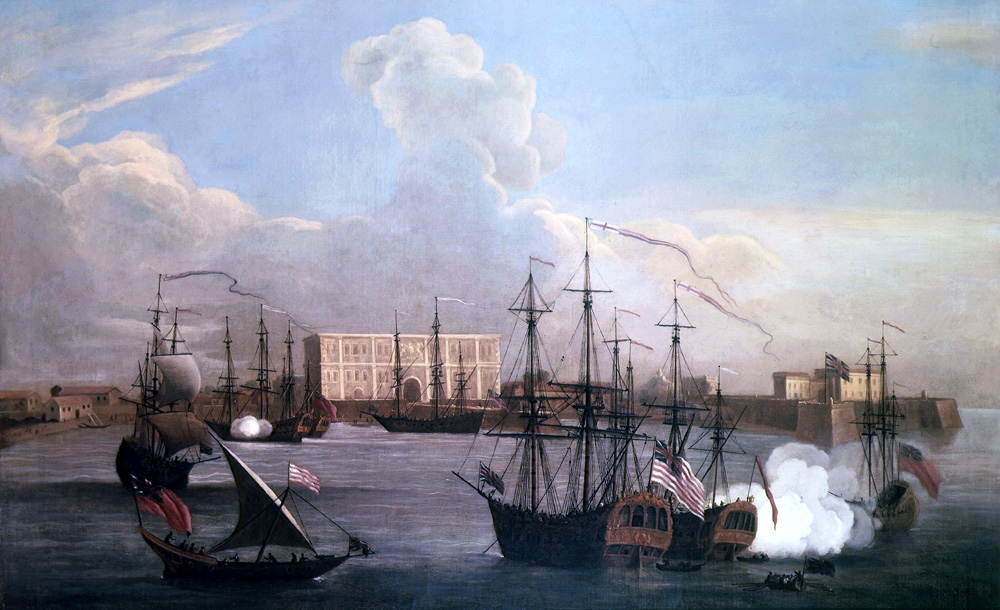
Ships in Bombay Harbour, c. 1731

Ships of the East India Company were called East Indiamen or simply "Indiamen". Their names were sometimes prefixed with the initials "HCS", standing for "Honourable Company's Service" or "Honourable Company's Ship", such as HCS Vestal (1809) and HCS Intrepid (1780).

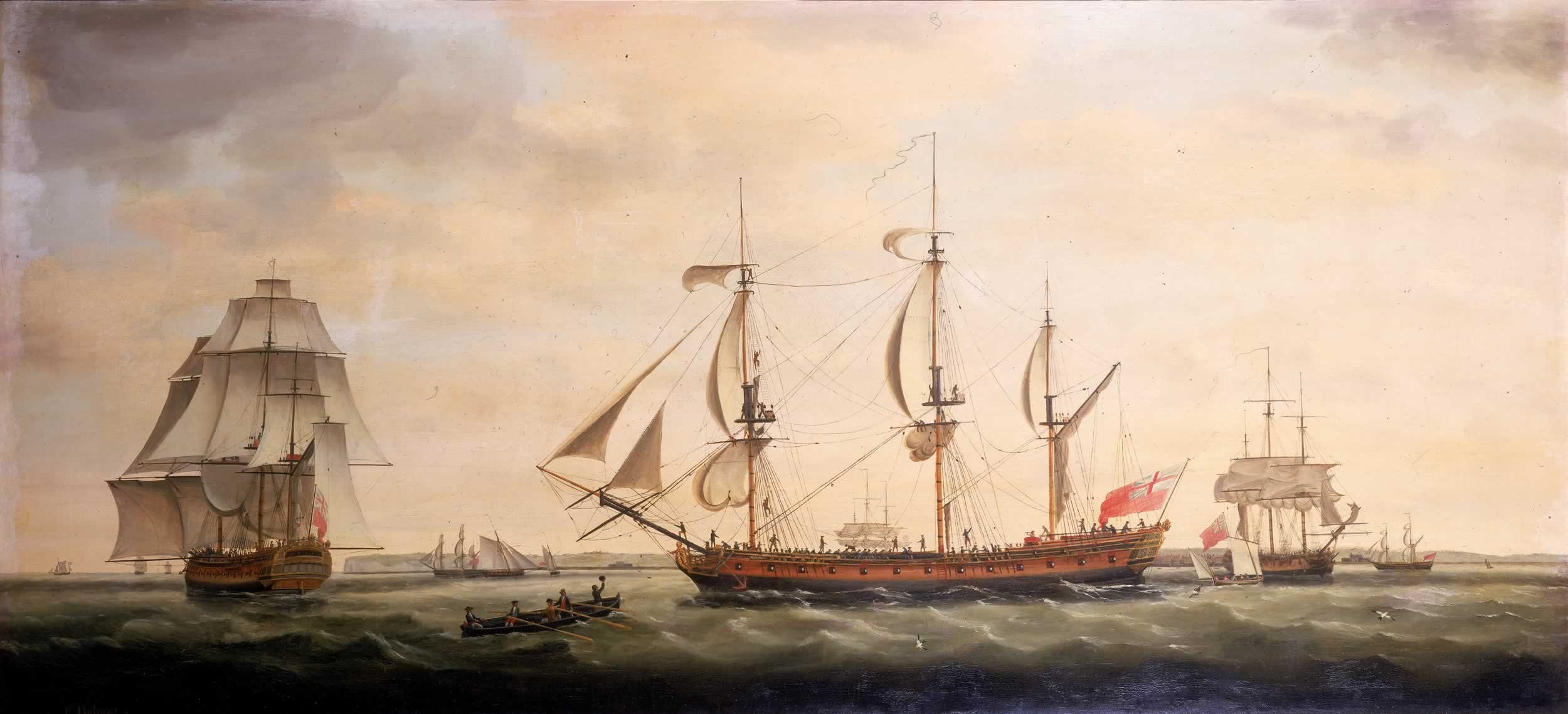
Royal George was one of the five East Indiamen the Spanish fleet captured in 1780.

During the French Revolutionary and Napoleonic Wars, the East India Company arranged for letters of marque for its vessels such as Lord Nelson. This was not so that they could carry cannon to fend off warships, privateers, and pirates on their voyages to India and China (that they could do without permission) but so that, should they have the opportunity to take a prize, they could do so without being guilty of piracy. Similarly, Earl of Mornington, an East India Company packet ship of only six guns, also sailed under a letter of marque.

In addition, the company had its own navy, the Bombay Marine, equipped with warships such as Grappler. These vessels often accompanied vessels of the Royal Navy on expeditions, such as the Invasion of Java. At the Battle of Pulo Aura, which was probably the company's most notable naval victory, Nathaniel Dance, Commodore of a convoy of Indiamen and sailing aboard the Warley, led several Indiamen in a skirmish with a French squadron, driving them off. Some six years earlier, on 28 January 1797, five Indiamen, Woodford, under Captain Charles Lennox, Taunton-Castle, Captain Edward Studd, Canton, Captain Abel Vyvyan, Boddam, Captain George Palmer, and Ocean, Captain John Christian Lochner, had encountered Admiral de Sercey and his squadron of frigates. On this occasion the Indiamen succeeded in bluffing their way to safety, and without any shots even being fired. Lastly, on 15 June 1795, General Goddard played a large role in the capture of seven Dutch East Indiamen off St Helena. East Indiamen were large and strongly built, and when the Royal Navy was desperate for vessels to escort merchant convoys, it bought several of them to convert to warships. Earl of Mornington became HMS Drake. Other examples include:

- HMS Calcutta
- HMS Glatton
- HMS Hindostan (1795)
- HMS Hindostan (1804)
- HMS Malabar
- HMS Buffalo

Their design as merchant vessels meant that their performance in the warship role was underwhelming, and the Navy converted them to transports. The amount of trade and shipping between Britain and company ports in India was considerable. For instance, in 1844, 534 ships (247,087 tons) arrived in Britain, and 540 vessels (239,368 tons) left UK ports for British India.

== Records ==
Unlike all other British Government records, the records from the East India Company (and its successor the India Office) are not in The National Archives at Kew, London, but are held by the British Library in London as part of the Asia, Pacific and Africa Collections. The catalogue is searchable online in the Access to Archives catalogues. Many of the East India Company records are freely available online under an agreement that the Families in British India Society has with the British Library. Published catalogues exist of East India Company ships' journals and logs, 1600–1834; accompanying catalogues also cover the company's daughter institutions, including the East India Company College, Haileybury, and Addiscombe Military Seminary.

The Asiatic Journal and Monthly Register for British India and its Dependencies, first issued in 1816, was sponsored by the East India Company, and includes much information relating to its work.

== Early governors ==
- 1600–1601: Sir Thomas Smythe (first governor)
- 1601–1602: Sir John Watts
- 1602–1603: Sir John Hart
- 1603–1606: Sir Thomas Smythe (re-elected)
- 1606–1607: Sir William Romney
- 1607–1621: Sir Thomas Smythe (re-elected)
- 1621–1624: Sir William Halliday
- 1624–1638: Sir Maurice (Morris) Abbot
- 1638–1641: Sir Christopher Clitherow

== See also ==
East India Company

- Category:Honourable East India Company regiments
- Category:Medals of the Honourable East India Company
- Company rule in India
  - Advocate-General of Bengal
  - Chief Justice of Bengal
  - Chief Justice of Madras
  - Economy of India under Company rule
  - Governor-General of India
  - Indian independence movement
  - Indian Rebellion of 1857
  - Presidency armies
- List of East India Company directors
- List of trading companies
- East India Company Cemetery in Macau

General

- Anglo-Nepalese war (1814–1816)
- British Imperial Lifeline
- Carnatic Wars
- Commercial Revolution
- Lascar
- Persian Gulf Residency
- Trade between Western Europe and the Mughal Empire in the 17th century
- Whampoa anchorage

Other

- Dutch East India Company
- French Indies Company
- Danish East India Company
- Portuguese East India Company
- Austrian East India Company
- Swedish East India Company
