= Racial views of Winston Churchill =

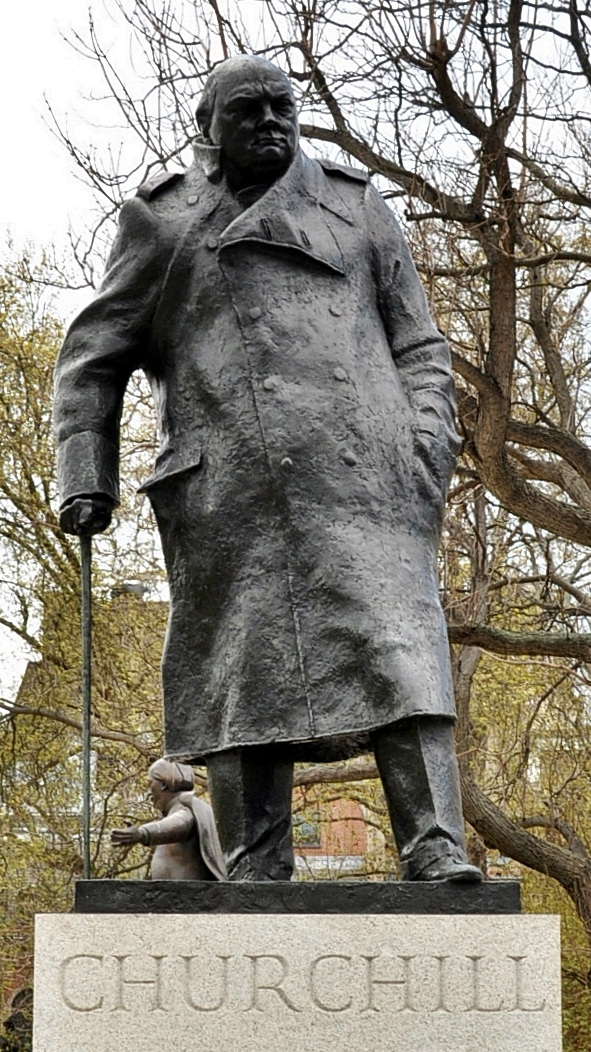
The statue of Winston Churchill in Parliament Square was sprayed with the words "was a racist" during a Black Lives Matter protest in 2020.

Winston Churchill's views on race and empire have been the subject of sustained historical debate. Formed through direct participation in British imperial campaigns in India, Sudan, and South Africa and shaped by the racial hierarchies that underpinned late Victorian imperial thought, Churchill held and expressed views on race throughout his life that ranged from paternalistic assumptions about colonial subjects to assertions of white Anglo-Saxon superiority.

Historians have assessed these views in sharply different ways. Critics such as Richard Toye and Priyamvada Gopal argue that Churchill's belief in a racial hierarchy, and the policies it informed, constituted racism whose consequences have been minimised in mainstream accounts of his legacy. Others, among them Andrew Roberts and Paul Addison, contend that applying the contemporary concept of racism to Churchill misrepresents the intellectual world in which he operated, and that his record, including his opposition to antisemitism and consistent support for Zionism, complicates any simple characterisation.

The debate has moved well beyond academic circles. The vandalising of his statue in Parliament Square during the 2020 protests, alongside debate in academic publishing and public broadcasting, has made Churchill's racial attitudes one of the most contested aspects of his legacy in contemporary Britain.

== Views of Churchill towards race ==
=== According to historians ===
John Charmley wrote that Churchill viewed British domination around the globe, such as the British Empire, as a natural consequence of social Darwinism. Charmley argued that similar to many of Churchill's contemporaries, he held a hierarchical perspective on race, believing white Protestant Christians to be at the top of this hierarchy, and white Catholics beneath them, while Indians were higher on this hierarchy than black Africans.

According to Richard Toye, he states that it's "factually correct" for one to say that Churchill was a racist. Toye also argues that Churchill's perspectives were not singular, and while Churchill may have harboured the belief in the superiority of white individuals, it does not necessarily imply an endorsement of inhumane treatment towards non-white individuals. (Note: Churchill may not have understood how beliefs about power dynamics can lead to inhumane behaviour as studies to that effect—such as the infamous 1971 Stanford Prison Experiment—were not available during his time.)

Paul Addison says Churchill saw British imperialism as a form of altruism that benefited its subject peoples because "by conquering and dominating other peoples, the British were also elevating and protecting them". To Churchill, the idea of dismantling the Empire by transferring power to its subject peoples was anathema – especially manifested in his opposition to the Government of India Act 1935 and his acerbic comments about Mahatma Gandhi, whom he called "a seditious Middle Temple lawyer, now posing as a fakir". Some critics have equated Churchill's imperialism with racialism, but Addison among others has argued that it is misleading to describe him as a racist in any modern context because the term as used now bears "many connotations which were alien to Churchill".

Following a cabinet meeting on 20 January 1955, conservative MP Harold Macmillan noted in a diary entry that Churchill allegedly thought "...‘Keep England White’ a good campaign slogan!” with regard to immigration from the West Indies.

Priyamvada Gopal had argued that Churchill's endorsement of racial hierarchy, indicated a clear pattern of racism and criticized what she describes as the whitewashing of his record.

=== Other sources ===
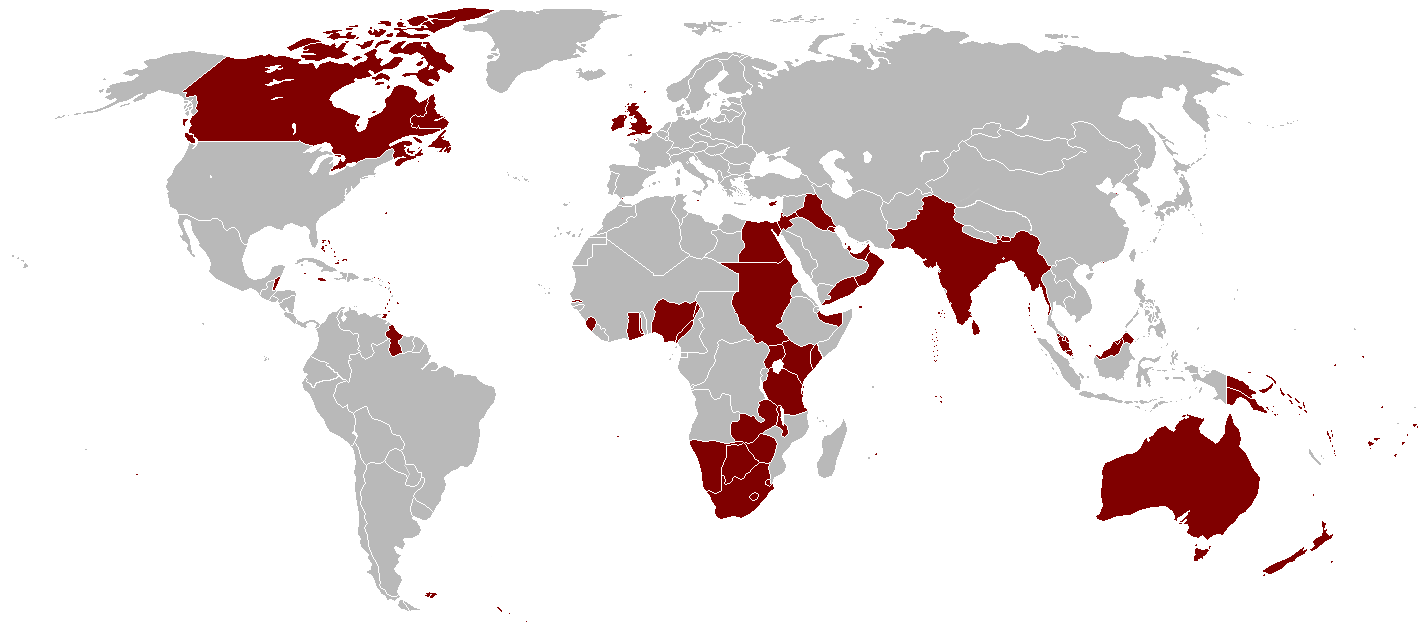
The British Empire at its territorial peak in 1921

Churchill advocated against native self-rule in Africa, America, Australia and India, and claimed that the British Empire promoted and maintained the welfare of those who lived in the colonies; however, other historians have challenged this view, arguing that imperial policies often caused significant harm.

In 1937, while speaking to the Palestine Royal Commission in favour of allowing Jews to settle in Mandatory Palestine, Churchill stated that:

I do not admit ... for instance, that a great wrong has been done to the Red Indians of America or the black people of Australia. I do not admit that a wrong has been done to these people by the fact that a stronger race, a higher-grade race, a more worldly wise race to put it that way, has come in and taken their place.

In 1899, a Boer jailer asked Churchill: "Is it right that a dirty Kaffir should walk on the pavement?… That's what they do in your British Colonies". Churchill termed this the root of Boer discontent:

British government is associated in the Boer farmer's mind with violent social revolution. Black is to be proclaimed the same as white … nor is a tigress robbed of her cubs more furious than is the Boer at this prospect.

In 1906, Churchill stated that "We will endeavour ... to advance the principle of equal rights of civilised men irrespective of colour".

Henry A. Wallace, Vice President of the USA, reports in his diary that during a White House lunch in May 1943 Churchill "said why be apologetic about Anglo-Saxon superiority, that we were superior, that we had the common heritage which had been worked out over the centuries in England and had been perfected by our constitution".

By the 1940s Churchill still cherished the ideals of imperialism that he had followed since the 1890s, while much of British opinion had abandoned them. Colonialism was now seen as a crude device for the oppression of the weak by the strong. After the Second World War, old arguments about white racial superiority were no longer acceptable. The British public rejected the Churchillian notion of an imperial race predestined by moral character to rule and refashion the world in the British image. Among younger Britons, especially in academic circles, criticism grew sharper. Indeed, the empire itself was rapidly disintegrating, starting with India gaining independence in 1947, and finishing up with all the African colonies becoming independent in the 1950s.

Churchill's personal doctor, Lord Moran, commented at one point that, in regard to other races, "Winston thinks only of the colour of their skin".

=== Disparaging remarks ===
Churchill is held to have made disparaging remarks about non-white ethnicities throughout his life. Philip Murphy partly attributes the strength of this vitriol to an "almost childish desire to shock" his inner circle. Churchill's response to the Bengal famine was criticised by contemporaries as slow, a controversy later increased by the publication of private remarks made to Secretary for India Leo Amery, in which Churchill allegedly said aid would be inadequate because "Indians [were] breeding like rabbits". Philip Murphy says that, following the independence of India in 1947, Churchill adopted a pragmatic stance towards empire, although he continued to use imperial rhetoric. During his second term as prime minister, he was seen as a moderating influence on Britain's suppression of armed insurgencies in Malaya and Kenya; he argued that ruthless policies contradicted British values and international opinion.

== Eugenics ==
When he was Home Secretary in 1910–1911, Churchill supported the forced sterilization of the "feeble minded". In a letter to Prime Minister H. H. Asquith in December 1910, he wrote "The unnatural and increasingly rapid growth of the Feeble-Minded and Insane classes […] constitutes a national and race danger which it is impossible to exaggerate. […] I feel that the source from which the stream of madness is fed should be cut off and sealed up before another year has passed".

In 1912 he attended the First International Eugenics Congress as Vice-President.

== India ==
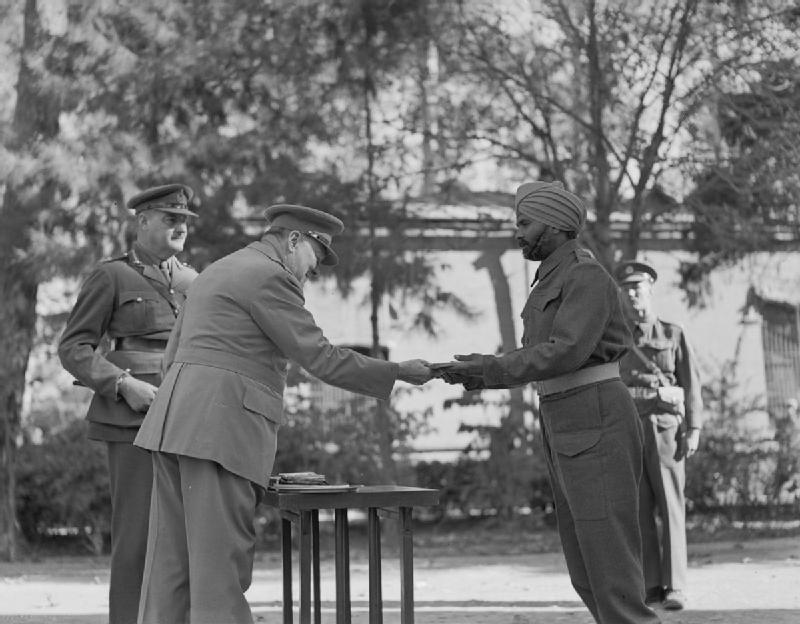
A Sikh soldier presents Churchill with a gift on his 69th birthday in Tehran.

Churchill made disparaging remarks about Indians. Some historians have debated whether Churchill was driven in this antipathy by imperialism or by racism. He was angered in Autumn 1930 by the Labour government's decision to grant dominion status to India. He argued that it would hasten calls for full independence from the British Empire. He joined the Indian Empire Society which opposed the granting of Dominion status. In his view, India was not ready for home rule because he believed that the Brahmins would gain control and further oppress both the "untouchables" and the religious minorities. In March 1931, when riots broke out in Cawnpore between Hindus and Muslims, he claimed that the situation proved his case.

John Charmley has argued that Churchill's denigration of Mahatma Gandhi in the early 1930s contributed to fellow British Conservatives' dismissal of his early warnings about the rise of Adolf Hitler. Churchill's comments on Indians – as well as his views on race as a whole – were judged by his contemporaries within the Conservative Party to be extreme. In 1935, Churchill invited Gandhi's friend, Ghanshyam Das Birla, to Chartwell, where he told him, "Mr. Gandhi has gone very high in my esteem since he stood up for the Untouchables," and expressed support for the Indian nationalists and advised them on how to improve the country, saying, "I am genuinely sympathetic towards India. I have got real fears about the future. India, I feel is a burden on us. We have got to maintain an army and for the sake of India we have to maintain Singapore and Near East strength. If India could look after herself we would be delighted. … I would be only too delighted if the Reforms are a success. I have all along felt that there are fifty Indias. But you have got the thing now; make it a success and if you do I will advocate your getting much more". Gandhi responded positively to Churchill's advice, and said, "I have held the opinion that I can always rely on his sympathy and goodwill".

Conversely, in 1906, Churchill defended the Indian minority in South Africa. In 1919, he openly condemned the Jallianwala Bagh massacre, referring to it as "unutterably monstrous". In April 1941, Churchill wrote to the Viceroy of India, "…it is as one who has had the honour to serve in the field with Indian soldiers from all parts of Hindustan, as well as in the name of His Majesty's Government, that I ask Your Excellency to convey to them and the whole Indian army the pride and admiration with which we have followed their exploits". In March 1942, Churchill sent Stafford Cripps on a mission to India ("the Cripps Mission") with an offer based on full Dominion status after the war, stating "We must remember that India has a great part to play in the world's struggle for freedom and that her helping hand must be extended in loyal comradeship to the valiant Chinese people, who have fought alone so long. We must remember also that India is one of the bases from which the strongest counter-blows must be struck at the advance of tyranny and aggression". This was rejected. Churchill later wrote, "I cannot see any objection to Indians serving on H.M. Ships where they are qualified and needed, or if their virtues so deserve rising to be Admirals of the Fleet. But not too many of them, please". In September of that year, Churchill addressed the House of Commons, praising India for its role and suggesting Gandhi be placed under protection, stating, "the Viceroy and Government of India, with the unanimous support of the Viceroy's Council, the great majority of which are Indians, patriotic and wise men, have felt it necessary to proclaim and suppress the central and Provincial organs of this association which has become committed to hostile and criminal courses. Mr. Gandhi and other principal leaders have been interned under conditions of the highest comfort and consideration, and will be kept out of harm's way till the troubles subside". At lunch in July 1944, Churchill said to India's representative on the War Cabinet Sir Arcot Ramasamy Mudaliar, "The old idea that the Indian was in any way inferior to the white man must go. We must all be pals together. I want to see a great shining India, of which we can be as proud as we are of a great Canada or a great Australia". After the War's end, Churchill paid tribute to the Indian contribution in the war, "The loyalty of the Indian Army to the King-Emperor, the proud fidelity to their treaties of the Indian Princes, the unsurpassed bravery of Indian soldiers and officers, both Moslem and Hindu, shine for ever in the annals of war". In 1948, he expressed shock at Gandhi's assassination.

In 1937, Churchill remarked on Jawaharlal Nehru that he is "Communist, Revolutionary, most capable and most implacable of the enemies of the British connection with India." Churchill later admired him and called him in 1955, "the light of Asia".

=== Bengal famine ===
Claims were made that during World War II, Churchill prioritised the stockpiling of food for Britain over feeding Indian subjects during the Bengal famine of 1943, against the pleas made by Secretary of State for India, Leo Amery and the Viceroy of India, Lord Linlithgow, but eventually eased the famine by directing shipments of grains to India from Australia. The famine resulted in the death of up to three million Indians which Madhusree Mukerjee has blamed on Churchill's response. However, Mukerjee also blamed "the Japanese occupation of Burma in March 1942, which cut off an essential supply of rice for India's poor".

Amery wrote in his private diaries that upon learning Indian separatists were refusing to resist the Japanese and contribute to the war effort, Churchill, in private conversation, said out of frustration, he "hated Indians" and considered them "a beastly people with a beastly religion". By "Indians", he meant "Hindus". According to Amery, during the Bengal famine, Churchill stated that any potential relief efforts sent to India would accomplish little to nothing, as Indians were "breeding like rabbits", but then asked his transport minister how they could be sent food. Leo Amery likened Churchill's understanding of India's problems to King George III's apathy for the Americas. Amery wrote "on the subject of India, Winston is not quite sane" and that he did not "see much difference between [Churchill's] outlook and Hitler's". In his 2018 biography of Winston Churchill, British historian Andrew Roberts commented on the topic by stating that: "Almost all of the remarks Leo Amery ascribed to Churchill were paraphrases rather than direct quotations, and should be seen in light of what one of the Prime Minister's private secretaries called his 'provocative humour'. These racially charged jokes, which would be regarded as totally unacceptable today, were then, as one historian puts it, 'part of the bedrock of contemporary British humour and were regular features of Punch during the inter-war years and after'".

His War Cabinet rejected Canadian proposals to send food aid to India, asking the US and Australia to send aid in their stead; according to historian Arthur Herman, Churchill's overarching concern was the ongoing Second World War, leading to his decisions to divert food supplies from India to Allied military campaigns. However, Churchill did push for whatever famine relief efforts India itself could provide, but these were hidebound by corruption and inefficiency in the Bengali government. Churchill responded by appointing Earl Wavell as Viceroy on 1 October 1943 and ordering the military under Wavell's direction to transport aid into Bengal. The combination of relief transports and a successfully harvested winter rice crop eased the famine in December 1943, but the death toll by then was over three million. When Churchill was first told of the severity, he wrote to Wavell, "The material and cultural conditions of the many peoples of India will naturally engage your earnest attention. The hard pressures of world-war have for the first time for many years brought conditions of scarcity, verging in some localities into actual famine, upon India. Every effort must be made, even by the diversion of shipping urgently needed for war purposes, to deal with local shortages". In April 1944, Churchill wrote to Franklin Roosevelt, "I am seriously concerned about the food situation in India and its possible reactions on our joint operations. Last year we had a grievous famine in Bengal through which at least 700,000 people died...I have had much hesitation in asking you to add to the great assistance you are giving us with shipping but a satisfactory situation in India is of such vital importance to the success of our joint plans against the Japanese that I am impelled to ask you to consider a special allocation of ships to carry wheat to India from Australia without reducing the assistance you are now providing for us, who are at a positive minimum if war efficiency is to be maintained. We have the wheat (in Australia) but we lack the ships". Churchill ordered the excess grain be exported to Europe instead of to the British Armed Forces troops on the front line, adding to the buffer stocks being created against the possibility of future second front invasions in both Greece and Yugoslavia.

== Africa ==
In 1899 Churchill described the Sudanese people as a ‘mongrel (...) mixture of the Arab and Negro types [which] produce[s] a debased and cruel breed, more shocking because they are more intelligent than the primitive savages’.

In 1907, Churchill made it a condition of British support for a United South Africa: "our right to be consulted effectively upon the native policy. I would not do anything for them without a sufficient return for the benefit of the native".

According to historian Roland Quinault:

His reservations about black majority rule [in Africa after 1950] were based on considerations of class, education and culture, rather than race and colour. In that respect, Churchill's attitude resembled that of the mid-Victorians to the working classes – they should be cautiously and gradually admitted into the body politic.

In 1942, an October meeting of Cabinet discussed colour bars after Viscount Cranbourne said that one of his black officials in the Colonial Office had been barred by a restaurant because U.S. officers had imposed a "whites-only" policy. Churchill addressed Cabinet (after making an insensitive joke, saying "That's alright, if he takes a banjo with him, they'll think he's one of the band".) and Cabinet concluded:

The US Army must not expect our authorities, civil or military, to assist them in enforcing a policy of segregation. It was clear that, so far as concerned admission to canteens, public houses, theatres, cinemas, and so forth, there would, and must not, be no restriction of the facilities hitherto extended to coloured persons as a result of the arrival of United States troops in this country.

After 1945 many and perhaps most black intellectuals and activists in the United States became convinced that Churchill's racism was a major factor in what they saw as his cynical attempt to buttress an exploitative overseas empire that Britain could no longer afford. They charged him with suppressing the democratic aspirations of people of colour.

South African President Thabo Mbeki said Churchill's attitude toward black people was racist and patronising. That complaint was shared by critics such as Clive Ponting. Historian Roland Quinault states that, "Even some historians otherwise sympathetic to Churchill have concluded that he was blind to the problems of black people".

== Arabs ==
Churchill described the Arabs as a "lower manifestation" than the Jews, whom he viewed as a "higher grade race" compared to the "great hordes of Islam". He referred to Palestinians as "barbaric hordes who ate little but camel dung".

Though he held particular contempt for Arabs, Churchill was supportive of Ibn Saud, insofar as Ibn Saud would support the policy for a Jewish state in Palestine that Churchill had driven personally in the 1920s. Churchill met Ibn Saud personally in February 1945 to discuss issues surrounding Palestine, though the meeting was reported by Saudis at the time as being widely unproductive, in great contrast to the meeting Ibn Saud had held with American President Franklin D. Roosevelt just days earlier.

== Jews ==
Churchill was wary of communist Jews and strongly supported Zionism. He described Jews as "the most formidable and the most remarkable race", whose "first loyalty will always be towards [Jews]".

Churchill had some sympathy for the "Jewish Bolshevism" conspiracy theory, and in his 1920 article which he titled "Zionism versus Bolshevism", he wrote that communism, which he considered a "worldwide conspiracy for the overthrow of civilization and for the reconstitution of society on the basis of arrested development, of envious malevolence, and impossible equality", had been established in Russia by Jews:

There is no need to exaggerate the part played in the creation of Bolshevism and in the actual bringing about of the Russian Revolution, by these international and for the most part atheistical Jews; it is certainly a very great one; it probably outweighs all others. With the notable exception of Lenin, the majority of the leading figures are Jews. Moreover, the principal inspiration and driving power comes from the Jewish leaders.

Although an antisemitic belief in an international Jewish conspiracy was not unique among British politicians of the time, few of them had the stature of Churchill. The article was criticised by the Jewish Chronicle at the time, calling it "the most reckless and scandalous campaign in which even the most discredited politicians have ever engaged". The Chronicle said Churchill had adopted "the hoary tactics of hooligan anti-Semites" in his article.

But according to Andrew Roberts, one of his biographers, Churchill rejected antisemitism for virtually all of his life. Roberts also describes Churchill as an "active Zionist" and philosemitic at a time when "clubland antisemitism... was a social glue for much of the Respectable Tendency". In the same article, Churchill wrote; "Some people like the Jews and some do not, but no thoughtful man can doubt the fact that they are beyond all question the most formidable and the most remarkable race that has ever appeared in the world". He further pointed out that the Bolsheviks were "repudiated vehemently by the great mass of the Jewish race", and concluded:

We owe to the Jews a system of ethics which, even if it were entirely separated from the supernatural, would be incomparably the most precious possession of mankind, worth in fact the fruits of all wisdom and learning put together.

Paul Addison claimed that Churchill opposed antisemitism (as in 1904, when he was fiercely critical of the proposed Aliens Bill) and argued that he would never have tried "to stoke up racial animosity against immigrants, or to persecute minorities".

Churchill described the Arabs as a "lower manifestation" than the Jews, whom he viewed as a "higher grade race" compared to the "great hordes of Islam".

In the lead-up to the Second World War, Churchill expressed disgust at Nazi antisemitism. In August 1932, while in Munich, Churchill was snubbed for a meeting by Adolf Hitler when the two happened to be sharing the same hotel. Churchill expressed to Hitler's confidante Ernst Hanfstaengl, "Why is your chief so violent about the Jews?... what is the sense of being against a man simply because of his birth? How can any man help how he is born?" When this was reported to him, Hitler declined the meeting. Clement Attlee recalled that Churchill openly wept when recounting to him the humiliations inflicted upon Jews by the SA during the Nazi boycott of Jewish businesses in April 1933.

== Palestine ==
In 1937, during the midst of the Arab revolt in Palestine, Churchill spoke at length during Parliamentary debates on the British policy in Palestine. Churchill insisted that the British government not renege on its 1917 promise to create a Jewish national home in Palestine, opposing the idea of granting Palestine self-rule due to the necessary Arab majority that would rule in Britain's place. Churchill held the belief that an eventual Jewish state within Palestine would advance the prosperity of the country, asking rhetorically before the Peel Commission:

Why is there injustice done if people come in and make a livelihood for more and make the desert into palm groves and orange groves?

Churchill's first-hand experience with Arab culture, both as a soldier and an MP, had "not impressed him", in the words of historian Martin Gilbert; an Arab majority in Palestine, Churchill maintained, would have resulted in both cultural and material stagnation. Malcom Mcdonald reported that Churchill stated that the Palestinian Arabs were "Barbaric hordes who ate little but camel dung".

Churchill rejected the Arab wish to stop Jewish migration to Palestine:

"I do not admit that the dog in the manger has the final right to the manger, though he may have lain there for a very long time I do not admit that right. I do not admit for instance that a great wrong has been done to the Red Indians of America or the black people of Australia. I do not admit that a wrong has been to those people by the fact that a stronger race, a higher-grade race or at any rate a more worldly-wise race, to put it that way, has come in and taken their place. I do not admit it. I do not think the Red Indians had any right to say, 'American continent belongs to us and we are not going to have any of these European settlers coming in here'. They had not the right, nor had they the power."

At the same time Churchill believed that British policy should not result in what he called "harsh injustice" to the Arab majority, and that the Arab people would not be displaced by the Jewish influx. He further emphasised the British responsibility to ensure that Palestine's Jews would not discriminate economically against their Arab neighbours, stating that such discrimination would result in the future restriction of Jewish immigration to Palestine. Churchill summarised his views before the Peel Commission bluntly: "It is a question of which civilisation you prefer".

== Ireland ==
In 1904 ten years before the passage of the third Home Rule bill, Churchill said about Irish Home Rule: "I remain of the opinion that a separate parliament for Ireland would be dangerous and impractical". He held a belief that Ireland should have remained part of the United Kingdom. However, in 1912, during a speech in Belfast, he supported the creation of an Irish parliament ruled from Dublin, a decision that upset Ulster Unionists. These comments were seen as a retraction of his comments from 1904. He said: "History and poetry, justice and good sense, alike demand that this race, gifted, virtuous and brave, which has lived so long and endured so much should not, in view of her passionate desire, be shut out of the family of nations and should not be lost forever among indiscriminate multitudes of men". He wanted a new relationship between Great Britain and Ireland to foster a "federation of English speaking peoples all over the world".

== China ==
In 1902, Churchill called China a "barbaric nation" and advocated for the "partition of China". He wrote:

I think we shall have to take the Chinese in hand and regulate them. I believe that as civilized nations become more powerful they will get more ruthless, and the time will come when the world will impatiently bear the existence of great barbaric nations who may at any time arm themselves and menace civilized nations. I believe in the ultimate partition of China – I mean ultimate. I hope we shall not have to do it in our day. The Aryan stock is bound to triumph.

In May 1954 Violet Bonham-Carter asked Churchill's opinion about a Labour Party visit to China. Winston Churchill replied:

I hate people with slit eyes and pigtails. I don't like the look of them or the smell of them – but I suppose it does no great harm to have a look at them.

== Chemical weapons in Iraq ==
Churchill was enthusiastic about the potential of chemical warfare after his appointment as Minister of Munitions in July 1917 during the First World War. Out of all ordnance and munitions, it is argued that Churchill who himself saw action on the Western Front placed his greatest faith in chemical warfare to win the war, after the Imperial German Army first used it in 1915. When arguing about the use of tear gas against Afghan rebels in the North-West Frontier Province of the British Raj in 1919, Churchill said "If it is fair for an Afghan to shoot down a British soldier behind a rock and cut him in pieces as he lies wounded on the ground, why is it not fair for a British artilleryman to fire a shell which makes the said native sneeze? It is really too silly".

In 1919 during the Russian Revolution, as Minister of War and Air, Churchill secretly had 50,000 stockpiled adamsite gas bombs shipped to Arkhangelsk in Russia for use against the Communist Bolshevik Red Army after Sir Keith Price, the head of chemical warfare at Porton Down, agreed with Churchill that its use would be effective. 509 were dropped in total to good effect, however this secret was soon revealed, and Churchill lied that the Bolsheviks were using chemical weapons, and the remaining British gas bombs were dumped in the White Sea.

In 1920 more than 100,000 armed tribesman revolted against British control in Iraq. Estimations suggested that 25,000 British and 80,000 Indian troops would be required to keep control of the country, however Churchill argued that if Britain relied on its air power, the number of troops in Iraq could be reduced to just 4,000 British and 10,000 Indian troops. This argument convinced the British government, and the recently formed Royal Air Force was sent to Iraq. Over the next few months the RAF dropped 97 tons of bombs, killing thousands of Iraqi tribesmen, but even so this failed to quell resistance – Arab and Kurdish uprisings in Iraq continued to endanger British rule. Between 2,500 and 10,000 Iraqis were killed in the revolt. Churchill suggested the use of tear gas by the RAF against the rebel tribesmen (referring to them as "uncivilized tribes") instead of continuing the bombing campaign as tear gas would frighten and disperse armed rebel tribesmen without loss of life and without serious or lasting effects on those caught in the gas.

I do not understand this squeamishness about the use of gas. We have definitely adopted the position at the Peace Conference of arguing in favour of the retention of gas as a permanent method of warfare. It is sheer affectation to lacerate a man with the poisonous fragment of a bursting shell and to boggle at making his eyes water by means of lachrymatory [tear] gas. I am strongly in favour of using poisoned gas against uncivilised tribes. The moral effect should be so good that the loss of life should be reduced to a minimum. It is not necessary to use only the most deadly gasses: gasses can be used which cause great inconvenience and would spread a lively terror and yet would leave no serious permanent effects on most of those affected.

Churchill's use of "uncivilised tribes" to refer to the rebel Iraqi tribesman, as well as his eagerness to use chemical weapons against them, is today a controversial topic. Unknown to many today, "Uncivilised tribe" was the then-accepted official term for a stateless opponent: the British Manual of Military Law stated that the law of war applied only to conflict "between civilized nations". Already in the Manual of 1914, it was clearly stated that "they do not apply in wars with uncivilized States and tribes"; instead the British commander should observe "the rules of justice and humanity" according to his own individual discretion. It should also be noted that although such language is seen as patronising and racist today, it was hardly unique to use such a phrase in the 1920s. Churchill's advocation for the use of chemical weapons by Britain on her enemies was not reserved for any specific peoples or race by any means. His defenders say that what he intended was the use of generally non-lethal (tear) gas, but those gases were known to kill children and the ill.

During the Second World War when Churchill was Prime Minister, he stated he was fully prepared to use lethal chemical weapons against German soldiers if Operation Sealion (Nazi Germany's planned 1940 invasion of the British mainland) had succeeded. On 30 May 1940, he told the Cabinet "we should not hesitate to contaminate our beaches with gas". He also proposed its use against the Empire of Japan during the same World War.

== Impact ==
In 2002, after Churchill was named the Greatest Briton of all time, journalist Amy Iggulden wrote an article collating some of Churchill's comments on race. According to an article by Amit Roy in 2003, Indians had traditionally seen Churchill in a negative light and his imperialist views as racist. In 2010, Madhusree Mukerjee wrote Churchill's Secret War which discussed about the possible role Churchill played in the Bengal famine. By the mid-2010s, there had been increase in discussion of the topic and several media outlets questioned whether there would be a reassessment of Churchill's legacy. Labour parliamentary candidate Benjamin Whittingham gained wide attention when he called Churchill a white supremacist in 2014.

During the George Floyd protests in the United Kingdom in June 2020, the statue of Winston Churchill in Parliament Square, London, was vandalised with spray paint with the phrase "was a racist" being scrawled underneath his name. The public outrage this caused was widespread both in the UK and abroad and garnered much media coverage which ultimately furthered public discussion of Churchill's views on race. In July, a BBC News at Ten report featured Indian historian Rudrangshu Mukherjee saying that Churchill was "seen as the precipitator of mass killing" due to allegations of his failure in the Bengal famine. Claims of anti-South Asian racism were also made against Churchill by Oxford University professor Yasmin Khan. Historians Tirthankar Roy and James Holland criticised the accuracy of the report. The historian Max Hastings also criticised the report for failing to contextualise Churchill's actions and former Panorama journalist Tom Mangold of uncritically endorsing a "woke" view of Churchill as a racist. In October, Churchill College launched Churchill, Empire and Race, to critically examine Churchill's views and actions relating to empire and race. In 2021, the programme was abruptly terminated following a dispute with the college's leadership. In 2022, Tariq Ali wrote Winston Churchill: His Times, His Crimes.

Various historians and academics have interpreted Churchill's views on race differently. Black studies specialist Kehinde Andrews accused Churchill of having the same racial views as Hitler, and of being "the perfect embodiment of white supremacy", an accusation he later made against the Queen, Elizabeth II, describing her similarly as "the number one symbol of white supremacy in the entire world", while popular historian Andrew Roberts said that "Churchill could be accused of paternalism, but certainly not race-hatred. No racist would describe Jawaharlal Nehru as “the light of Asia”, or the Indian Army as displaying “glorious heroism and martial qualities” in the way that Churchill did". Richard M. Langworth believes that critics ignore Churchill's political and moral growth during the course of his life. In addition, he says that critics oversimplify the complexities of the period on issues of race when criticizing Churchill. He accuses them of leaving out Churchill's positive comments on race, quoting out of context and not presenting evidence that Churchill tried to prevent the Bengal famine.

== See also ==
- Political positions of Winston Churchill
- Racism in the British Conservative Party
- Racism in the United Kingdom
