= Media coverage of the 1943 Bengal famine =

The Bengal famine of 1943–44 was a major famine in the Bengal province (Note: The area now constitutes part of Bangladesh and the Indian states of West Bengal and Tripura. The famine also affected the neighbouring province of Orissa, albeit to a far smaller degree (Famine Inquiry Commission 1945a, pp. 1, 144–45; Maharatna 1992, pp. 320–33). Orissa was hit by a cyclone on 10 April 1943.) in British India during World War II. An estimated 2.1 million, (Note: Cormac Ó Gráda (2007): "Compare ... the claim by the Secretary of State for India at the height of the Bengali famine of 1943–44 that the weekly death toll was about one thousand—although 'it might be higher'—at a time when the true figure was about forty thousand. Subsequent estimates of mortality in Bengal range from 0.8 million to 3.8 million; today the scholarly consensus is about 2.1 million (Hall-Matthews 2005; Sen 1981; Maharatna 1996)." Initial official estimates of the Famine Inquiry Commission (1945a, pp. 109–10) indicated around 1.5 million deaths in excess of the average mortality rate, out of Bengal's then estimated population of 60.3 million. The widely cited results of A. Sen (1980) and A. Sen (1981a, pp. 196–202) used a variety of means to arrive at an estimate of between 2.7 and 3 million; Greenough (1982, pp. 299–309) suggested that Sen's figures should be raised to between 3.5 and 3.8 million. See either Maharatna (1996) or Dyson & Maharatna (1991) for a detailed review of the data and the various estimates made.) out of a population of 60.3 million, died from starvation, malaria and other diseases aggravated by malnutrition, population displacement, unsanitary conditions, and lack of health care. Millions were impoverished as the crisis overwhelmed large segments of the economy and social fabric.

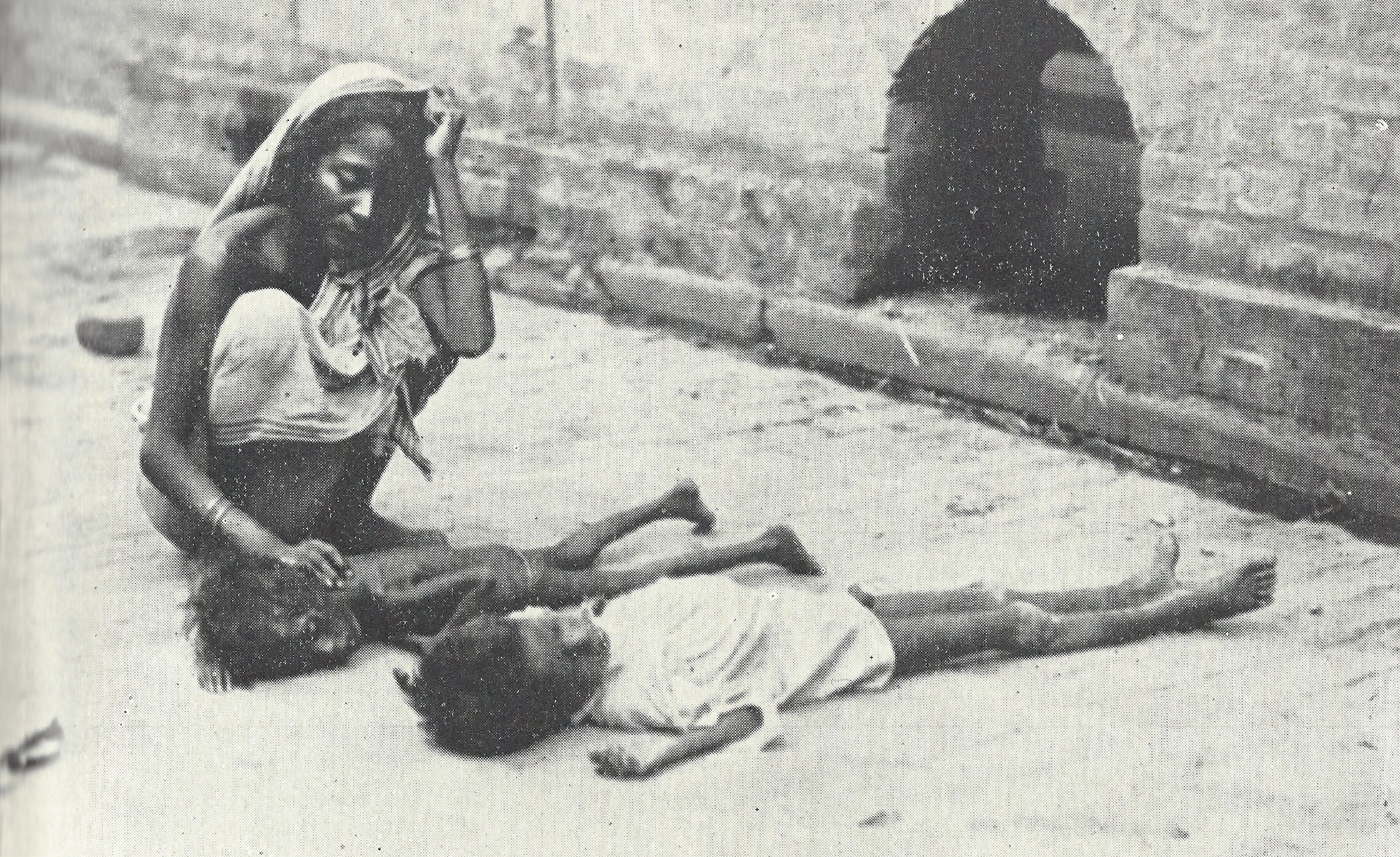
Published by Ian Stephens in The Statesman on 22 August 1943

Calcutta's two leading English-language newspapers were The Statesman (at that time a British-owned newspaper) (Note: The Statesman was sold in 1962 to "a consortium of Indian industrialists" (Hirschmann 2004, p. 155)) and Amrita Bazar Patrika. In the early months of the famine, the government applied pressure on newspapers to "calm public fears about the food supply" and follow the official stance that there was no rice shortage. This effort had some success; The Statesman published editorials asserting that the famine was due solely to speculation and hoarding, while "berating local traders and producers, and praising ministerial efforts." (Note: The Statesman was the only major newspaper that had acquiesced to (or been persuaded by) government pressure to present the Quit India movement in a negative light (Greenough 1983, p. 355, note 7; Greenough 1999, p. 43, note 7).) News of the famine was also subject to strict war-time censorship – even use of the word "famine" was prohibited – leading The Statesman later to remark that the UK government "seems virtually to have withheld from the British public knowledge that there was famine in Bengal at all".

Beginning in mid-July 1943 and more so in August, however, these two newspapers began publishing detailed and increasingly critical accounts of the depth and scope of the famine, its impact on society, and the nature of British, Hindu, and Muslim political responses. For example, a headline in Amrita Bazar Patrika that month warned "The Famine conditions of 1770 are already upon us," alluding to an earlier Bengal famine that caused the deaths of one third of Bengal's population. It also published an editorial cartoon showing starving peasants gazing at distant international food aid ships with the caption "A Mirage! A Mirage!" The Statesman's reportage and commentary were similarly pointed, as for example when it opined that the famine was "man-made".

A turning point in news coverage came in late August 1943, when the editor of The Statesman, Ian Stephens, had a series of graphic photographs of the victims taken, some of which he published on 22 and 29 August. Publication of the images greatly affected both domestic and international perceptions and sparked an international media frenzy. In Britain, The Guardian called the situation "horrible beyond description". Not only had the rest of the world been unaware of the famine: many in India itself had had little idea of the scope of it. The images had a profound effect and marked "for many, the beginning of the end of colonial rule". Stephens' decision to publish them and to adopt a defiant editorial stance won accolades from many (including the Famine Inquiry Commission), and has been described as "a singular act of journalistic courage and conscientiousness, without which many more lives would have surely been lost". The photographs spurred Amrita Bazar Patrika and the Indian Communist Party's organ, The People's War, to publish similar images; the latter would make photographer Sunil Janah famous.

== Works cited ==
- Famine Inquiry Commission (May 1945). Report on Bengal (pdf). New Delhi: Manager of Publications, Government of India Press.
- Dutt, Romesh Chunder (2013). The Economic History of India Under Early British Rule: From the Rise of the British Power in 1757 to the Accession of Queen Victoria in 1837. New York: Routledge. ISBN 978-1-136-38252-9.
- Dyson, Tim; Maharatna, Arup (September 1991). "Excess mortality during the Great Bengal Famine: A Re-evaluation". The Indian Economic & Social History Review. 28 (3): 281–97. doi:10.1177/001946469102800303. S2CID 143627077.
- Greenough, Paul R. (1980). "Indian Famines and Peasant Victims: the Case of Bengal in 1943–44". Modern Asian Studies. 14 (2): 205–35. doi:10.1017/s0026749x00007319. JSTOR 312413. PMID 11614969.
- Greenough, Paul R. (1982). Prosperity and Misery in Modern Bengal: The Famine of 1943–1944. Oxford University Press. ISBN 978-0-19-503082-2.
- Greenough, Paul R. (1983). "Political Mobilization and the Underground Literature of the Quit India Movement, 1942–44". Modern Asian Studies. 17 (3): 353–86. doi:10.1017/s0026749x00007538. JSTOR 312297. Reprinted as Greenough, Paul R. (1999). "Political Mobilization and the Underground Literature of the Quit India Movement, 1942–44". Social Scientist. 27 (7/8): 11–47. doi:10.2307/3518012. JSTOR 3518012.
- Hirschmann, Edwin (Summer 2004). "The Hidden Roots of a Great Newspaper: Calcutta's 'Statesman'". Victorian Periodicals Review. 37 (2, The Nineteenth-Century Press in India): 141–60. JSTOR 20084003.
- Sen, Amartya (1976). "Famines as Failures of Exchange Entitlements". Economic and Political Weekly. 11 (31/33, Special Number: Population and Poverty): 1273+1275+1277+1279–1280. JSTOR 4364836.
- Sen, Amartya (1977). "Starvation and exchange entitlements: a general approach and its application to the Great Bengal Famine". Cambridge Journal of Economics. 1 (1): 33–59. doi:10.1093/oxfordjournals.cje.a035349.
- Sen, Amartya (1980). "Famine Mortality: A Study of the Bengal Famine of 1943". In Eric J. Hobsbawm (ed.). Peasants in history: essays in honour of Daniel Thorner. Published for Sameeksha Trust by Oxford University Press. ISBN 0195612159.
- Sen, Amartya (1981a). Poverty and Famines: An Essay on Entitlement and Deprivation. New York: Oxford University Press. (See chapter 6: "The Great Bengal Famine"). ISBN 978-0-19-828463-5.
- Sen, Amartya (1981b). "Ingredients of Famine Analysis: Availability and Entitlements". The Quarterly Journal of Economics. 96 (3): 433–64. doi:10.2307/1882681. JSTOR 1882681. PMID 11615084. (subscription required)
- Sen, Bhowani (1945). Rural Bengal in Ruins. Translated by N. Chakravarty. Bombay: People's Publishing House. OCLC 27855268.
- Vernon, James (2009). Hunger: A Modern History. Cambridge, MA: Harvard University Press. ISBN 978-0-674-04467-8.
- Maharatna, Arup (1992). The demography of Indian famines: A historical perspective (Ph.D.). London School of Economics and Political Science (United Kingdom).
- Islam, M. Mufakharul (2007a). "The Great Bengal Famine and the Question of FAD Yet Again". Modern Asian Studies. 41 (2): 421–40. doi:10.1017/S0026749X06002435. ISSN 0026-749X.
- Mukerjee, Madhusree (2010). Churchill's Secret War: The British Empire and the Ravaging of India During World War II. New York: Basic Books. ISBN 978-0-465-00201-6.
- Mukerjee, Madhusree (2014). "Bengal Famine of 1943: An Appraisal of the Famine Inquiry Commission". Economic and Political Weekly. 49 (11): 71–75.
- Mukherjee, Janam (2015). Hungry Bengal: War, Famine and the End of Empire. New York: Oxford University Press. ISBN 978-0-19-061306-8.
- Mukherji, Saugata (1986). "Agrarian Class Formation in Modern Bengal, 1931–51". Economic and Political Weekly. 21 (4): PE11–PE21+PE24–PE27. JSTOR 4375249.
- Ó Gráda, Cormac (2007). "Making Famine History". Journal of Economic Literature. 45 (1): 5–38. doi:10.1257/jel.45.1.5. hdl:10197/492. ISSN 0022-0515. JSTOR 27646746.(subscription required)
- Ó Gráda, Cormac (2008). "The ripple that drowns? Twentieth-century famines in China and India as economic history". Economic History Review. 61 (S1): 5–37. doi:10.1111/j.1468-0289.2008.00435.x. hdl:10197/473.
- Ó Gráda, Cormac (2009). Famine: A Short History. Princeton University Press. ISBN 978-0-691-12237-3.
- Ó Gráda, Cormac (2010). "Revisiting the Bengal Famine of 1943–44". History Ireland. 18 (4, The Elephant and Partition: Ireland and India): 36–39. JSTOR 27823027.
- Ó Gráda, Cormac (2015). "'Sufficiency and Sufficiency and Sufficiency': Revisiting the Great Bengal Famine of 1943–44". Eating People Is Wrong, and Other Essays on Famine, Its Past, and Its Future. Princeton University Press. ISBN 9781400865819 – via De Gruyter. An earlier and somewhat different version is available in a conference paper available at UCD Centrefor Economic Research (Working Paper Series). Accessed 9 February 2016.
