= Intercultural Open University Foundation =

- IOUF Logo
- Established: 1981
- President: Sandra Hurlong, PhD
- Location: Arden, DE (US) and Granada (Spain); 39°48′49″N 75°29′02″W
- Campus: Distributed Education
- Website: www.ioufoundation.org

The Intercultural Open University Foundation (IOUF) is an international non-profit charitable organization that provides distance learning courses to master's and PhD students. IOUF offers dual degree programs in association with Universidad Azteca and its partner the Universidad Central de Nicaragua (UCN). Upon successful completion of the course, students are awarded with the Doctor of Philosophy, PhD degree in consortium with UAzteca and UCN.

The faculty and staff of IOUF contribute their time on a volunteer basis. To promote the higher education in developing countries, a limited number of scholarships are provided. The scholarship program was begun by the founders of the Intercultural Open University Foundation, Jan R. Hakemulder and Fay A.C. DeJonge. Jan Hakemulder was an academician who worked on the development programs designed to help the world's poor as an educational consultant for UNICEF. He and his wife, Fay A.C. DeJonge wrote about many subjects such as journalism, the media and ethics, alternative education, distance education and peace and non-violence studies.

The Intercultural Open University Foundation is registered as a non-profit foundation in the United States and maintains offices in Arden, Delaware and Granada, Spain. Although it originally obtained registration as a foundation in the Netherlands, it no longer maintains offices in that country, having transferred its European headquarters to Spain in August, 2011 and it is no longer registered as a Dutch juridical person. The use of Information and communications technology in IOUF has been assessed and validated by the European Commission's HEXTLEARN Peer Review and Study. IOUF is a member of international educational organizations such as European Distance and E-learning Network (EDEN), European Foundation for Quality in e-Learning (EFQUEL).

As a charitable foundation, IOUF is an independent legal entity with a stated mission of serving the public interest through higher education and research. Its status as a not-for-profit organization confers favorable tax status on activities undertaken in pursuit of Foundation goals.

== History ==
The Intercultural Open University Foundation was established in 1981 by Jan R. Hakemulder. During his tenure as an educational advisor with UNESCO in Africa, Jan and his wife Fay A.C. DeJonge, convened a meeting of Dutch, German and English professors at Bosk House in Opeinde, Netherlands. After this meeting, the group decided to provide distributed educational programs focused on the social subjects to students around the world, the Intercultural Open University Foundation was the result.

The foundation was the subject of controversy when John Bear, a writer on educational institutions, questioned its status. The foundation also came under attack in 2008 when CIMEA, the Italian Information Centre on Academic Mobility and Equivalence, claimed it had "dubious professors with dubious credentials that somehow (connected it) to UNESCO." CIMEA subsequently posted a letter from the foundation's president, board of governors and faculty protesting the reference.

In 2007, Skepsis, a Dutch magazine which aims to debunk pseudoscience, published an article stating that the founders of the Intercultural Open University Foundation held PhD degrees from distance-learning institutions. The article also stated that the foundation awarded degrees in India for about 250 Euros while charging 8000 Euros for students from developed countries as a part of the "Robin Hood strategy: what the rich pay too much, is given to the less fortunate." by the Hakemulders. The author stated that he doubted that the professors of the IOUF could legally bear the legally protected Dutch title doctor (dr.).

IOUF founder and president Jan Hakemulder died in August, 2008. After his death, IOUF's board of governors appointed Sandra Hurlong as the interim president of the foundation. From the estate of Jan Hakemulder, an endowment was established to fund the institution. In August 2009, the IOUF announced Dr. Hurlong as the appointed president. Under her direction, the foundation shifted its focus to graduate dual degrees programs exclusively.

In October 2011, IOUF signed an academic co-operation agreement with the Universidad Azteca (UAzteca). According to the agreement upon successful completion of the program, IOUF PhD students will be awarded an international double degree offered jointly by the Universidad Azteca and its partner, the Universidad Central de Nicaragua (UCN).

== Professional memberships ==
The Intercultural Open University Foundation is a member of:

- Alternative Education Resource Organization (AERO)
- European Distance and E-learning Network (EDEN)
- European Foundation for Quality in eLearning (EFQUEL)
- International Association of Educators for World Peace (IAEWP)
- United States Distance Learning Association

Other affiliations Include:

- Human Dignity and Humiliation Studies Group
- Universidad Azteca
- Universidad Central de Nicaragua
- University of Rajasthan

== Academics ==
Intercultural Open University Foundation offers programs in social science, environmental science, health science, psychology, sociology, anthropology, international business management, social change, education for sustainable development, religious studies.

== Notable people ==
Faculty:

- Leena Parmar, PhD in sociology, University of Rajasthan. Indian sociologist noted for her long-standing connections to the Indian army and her knowledge of its complex operations in India's sensitive border regions
- Rudolph J. (Rudy) Passler, Ph.D. international affairs, University of Delaware
- Marvin Surkin, PhD in political science, New York University. Political scientist whose studies on race and ethnic studies informed his work as co-author of "Detroit: I Do Mind Dying: A Study in Urban Revolution"
- Muneo Jay Yoshikawa, PhD in intercultural communication, University of Hawaii. Creator of the double-swing model of inter-cultural communication.

Graduates:

- Sohan L. Gandhi, PhD in sociology, Intercultural Open University Foundation. Editor of the ANUVIBHA Reporter and honorary president of the ANUVRAT Global Organization (ANUBIS), a transnational Center for Peace and Nonviolent Action associated with the UN-DPI.
- Gulab Kothari, PhD, IOU Foundation, 2002. Editor and managing director of Rajasthan Patrika; author of three volume series - " Manas - The Human Mind"
- Serguei Krivov, PhD, IOU Foundation, 1999. Assistant research professor, University of Vermont; developed the multiagent ecological simulator LEM, based on his logic based conceptual framework for the modeling of complex systems.
- Bremley W.B.Lyngdoh, PhD, IOU Foundation, 2008. Member of the Waldzell Institute, founder and CEO of Worldview Impact, co-founder of the Global Youth Action Network
