= Gulab Kothari =

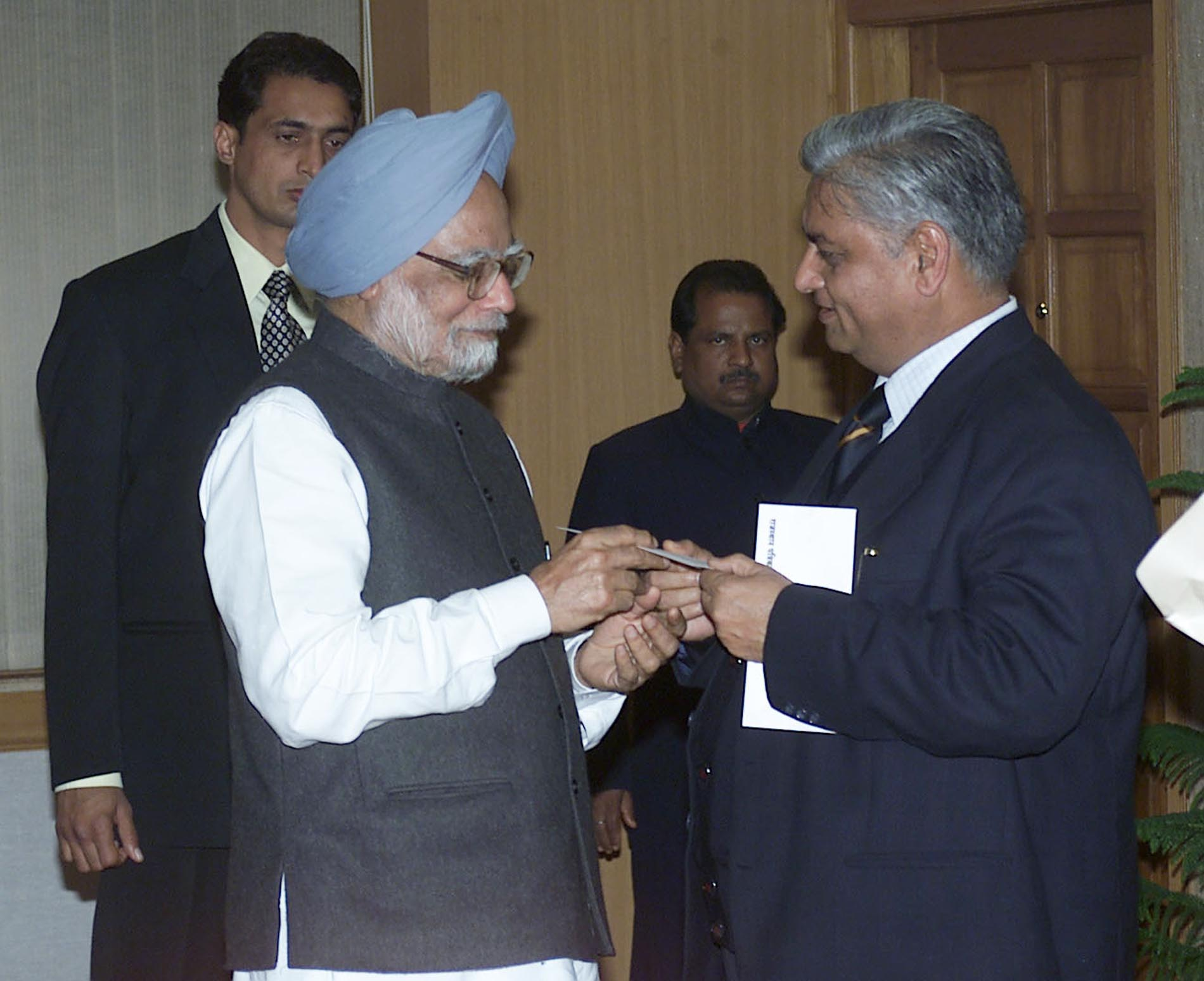
- Gulab Kothari presenting a cheque to the Prime Minister, Dr. Manmohan Singh towards Prime Minister’s National Relief Fund in New Delhi on January 29, 2005
- Occupations: Author, journalist, chief editor of rajasthan patrika

Gulab Kothari is an Indian author, and editor-in-chief of Rajasthan Patrika. Kothari is known for his contributions to Vedic Studies and was conferred with the Moortidevi Award in 2011, for his book Mein Hi Radha, Mein Hi Krishna.

== Education ==
Kothari received D.Litt. in philosophy from Intercultural Open University (IOU) in 2002. In March 2004, Kothari was nominated as the newly set-up Pandit Madhusudan Ojha chair at the University of Rajasthan to promote research on Vedas, by IOU. In August 2014, Kothari was awarded PhD in administration from Universidad Central de Nicaragrua (UCN) and Universidad Azteca (UA).

== Awards and recognition ==
- Moorthidevi Award (2011)
- Bhartendu Harishchandra Award (2000)
- Govt. of India's National Unity Award (1993)
- Raja Ram Mohan Roy Award (2019)
