= Muneo Yoshikawa =

Japanese professor (born 1939)

Muneo Jay Yoshikawa
- Born: 吉川 宗男; 1938 (age 87–88); Tokyo
- Education: Ph.D. (1980) University of Hawaii; M.A. (1967) University of Hawaii; B.A. (1962) Linfield College
- Occupations: professor, author, researcher, consultant
- Known for: double-swing model

Muneo Jay Yoshikawa (吉川 宗男) is a Japanese professor, author, researcher and consultant in the fields of intercultural communication, human development, human resource management, and leadership.

== Career ==
Muneo Yoshikawa was born in Tokyo in 1938 and went to study in the United States at the age of 18, graduating from Linfield College in Oregon. He then received his graduate degree and subsequently a Ph.D. from the University of Hawaii. Yoshikawa retired from the University of Hawaii after 35 years of teaching, currently residing in Japan.

Yoshikawa studied the Communication Theory, the New Paradigm Theory, and the Life Information Science Theory. He developed communication theories in the education, health, and business fields, best known among them being the double-swing model of intercultural communication.

He holds the rank of professor emeritus at the University of Hawaii and he is a member of the Board of Directors of Intercultural Open University Foundation (he was originally involved as a mentor and international advisor to this foundation since its inception in 1981). He is also co-director of Mobius Graduate School in Tokyo, councilor of the International Advisory Counsel of The Asian Strategy & Leadership Institute (Malaysia) and associate of Ken Blanchard Companies (San Diego, California). Yoshikawa is also involved in corporate education field, with a focus on multinational and multicultural companies.

== Double-swing model ==
The double-swing model (also known as the Möbius integration philosophy) is model of intercultural communication, originated by Muneo Yoshikawa, conceptualizing how individuals, cultures, and intercultural notions can meet in constructive ways. The communication is understood as an infinite process where both parties change in the course of the communicative or translational exchange, emphasizing that both communication parties play the role of addresser and addressee.

The dialogical mode draws upon the Buddhist philosophy (the logic of soku hi) and the ideas of the Jewish philosopher Martin Buber (the I-Thou relationship) in seeing human beings as complete only in relationship. Whilst the dialogue is between two people who are separate and independent, they are simultaneously and inevitably interdependent. The model is graphically presented as the infinity symbol (∞), also as a Möbius strip, visualizing the twofold movement between the self and the other that allows for both unity and uniqueness.

== Publications ==
- Yoshikawa, M. J. (1973). Psycho-sociological implications of the Japanese interpersonal communication patterns. In N. D. Liem (Ed.), Aspects of vernacular languages in Asian and Pacific societies (pp. 1–17). Honolulu, HI: Southeast Asian Studies Program, University of Hawaii at Manoa.
- Yoshikawa, M. J. (1977). Implications of Martin Buber’s philosophy of dialogue in Japanese and American intercultural communication. Communication: The Journal of the Communication Association of the Pacific, 6(1), 103-124.
- Yoshikawa, M. J. (1978). Some Japanese and American cultural characteristics. In M. H. Prosser, The cultural dialogue: An introduction to intercultural communication (pp. 220–230). Boston, MA: Houghton Mifflin.
- Yoshikawa, M. J. (1980). The dialogical approach to Japanese-American intercultural encounter. Unpublished doctoral dissertation, University of Hawaii at Manoa, Honolulu, HI.
- Yoshikawa, M. J. (1984). Culture, cognition, and communication: Implications of the “paradoxical relationship” for intercultural communication. Communication and Cognition, 17(4), 377-385.
- Yoshikawa, M. J. (1987). Cross-cultural adaptation and perceptual development. In Y. Y. Kim & W. B. Gudykunst (Eds.), Cross-cultural adaptation: Current approaches (pp. 140–148). Newbury Park, CA: Sage.
- Yoshikawa, M. J. (1987). The double-swing model of intercultural communication between the East and the West. In D. L. Kincaid (Ed.), Communication theory: Eastern and Western perspectives (pp. 319–329). San Diego, CA: Academic Press.
- Yoshikawa, M. J. (1988). Japanese and American modes of communication and implications for managerial and organizational behavior. In W. Dissanayake (Ed.), Communication theory: The Asian perspective (pp. 150–182). Singapore: Asian Mass Communication Research and Information Center.
- Yoshikawa, M. J. (1989). Popular performing arts: Manzai and rakugo. In R. G. Powers & H. Kato (Eds.), Handbook of Japanese popular culture (pp. 75–96). New York: Greenwood Press.
- Hijirida, K., & Yoshikawa, M. J. (1987). Japanese language and culture for business and travel. Honolulu, HI: University of Hawaii Press.

== Awards ==
- Hawaii University Teaching Award (Hawaii, USA)
- American Youth Teaching Award (Hawaii, USA)
