= Double-swing model =

Model of intercultural communication

The double-swing model (also known as the Möbius integration philosophy) is a model of intercultural communication, originated by Muneo Yoshikawa, conceptualizing how individuals, cultures, and intercultural notions can meet in constructive ways. The communication is understood as an infinite process where both parties change in the course of the communicative or translational exchange.

== Overview ==
Yoshikawa highlights four major ways of handling the crossing of a cultural boundary:

- The ethnocentric mode – In this mode I take no interest whatsoever in the perspective of the person with whom I am speaking, concentrating entirely on my own point of view.
- The control mode – Here, I do take an interest in the beliefs of my conversational partner, but I do not take them seriously. The information is only useful in assisting me to manipulate the situation in my advantage.
- The dialectical mode – In this case, my objective amounts to something like fusion of opinions. My purpose is to make differences disappear, so that both I and the person with whom I am communicating lose any sense of independent identity. Thus true differences get lost beneath a spuriously generated consensus.
- The dialogical mode – The above three modes all assume that encounters are between individuals who are at some fundamental level isolated from each other. The dialogical mode draws upon the Buddhist philosophy (the logic of soku hi) and the ideas of the Jewish philosopher Martin Buber (the I-Thou relationship) in seeing human beings as complete only in relationship. Whilst the dialogue is between two people who are separate and independent, they are simultaneously and inevitably interdependent. It is from this stance of mutual respect that the difficult process of entering the gap in understanding takes place.

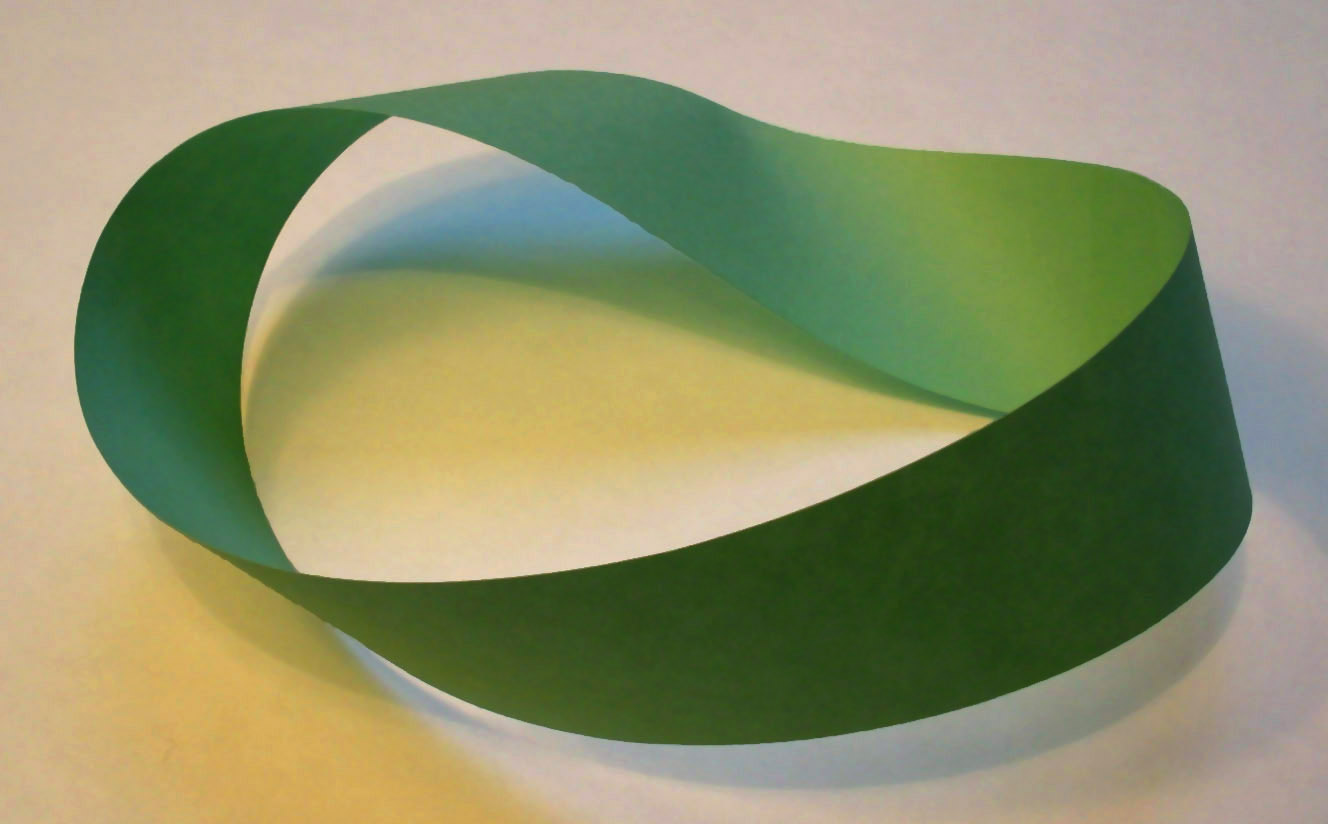
A Möbius strip.

He emphasizes that both communication parties play the role of addresser and addressee. In the double-swing model, communication is seen as an infinite process and the two participants will both change during their meeting. He underlines that the goal of communication is not to eliminate differences, but to use the dynamics that arise through the encounter.

The model is graphically presented as the infinity symbol (∞), also as a Möbius strip, visualizing the twofold movement between the self and the other that allows for both unity and uniqueness. The front side and the back side of the strip appear divided, but both sides are apparently interconnected, and may be viewed as one and the same. This theoretical model indicates that one is neither this side or that side nor beyond both sides, but one is the between. Yoshikawa calls the unity that is created out of the realization of differences "identity in unity". This dialogical unity does not eliminate the tension between basic potential unity and apparent duality.

Yoshikawa coined the term "dynamic in-betweenness", suggesting how the individual is able to move between different cultural traditions, acting appropriately and feeling at home in each, and in doing so simultaneously maintains an integrated, multi-cultural sense of self. Rather than the either/or identity of encapsulated marginals, constructive marginals experience their movement between cultures as both/and.

The model has been related to the notion of pendulation described by Peter A. Levine, the swinging back and forth between our point of view and that of the other that allows the potential for understanding each other.

== History ==
In 1978, Muneo Yoshikawa published an essay of personal reflections upon his psychological evolution as a Japanese in the United States, highlighting the role of identity inclusiveness and identity security as the very essence of what it means to be an interculturally competent person. In 1980, he first proposed the double-swing model, developing it later in 1987. The theory became also known as the Möbius integration philosophy and served as a premise for the theory of "integrative philosophy", developed by Muneo Yoshikawa in collaboration with Shozo Hibino.
