= JS (magazine) =

Indian youth magazine (1967–1977)

- Editor: Desmond Doig
- Categories: Youth culture
- Frequency: Weekly (later fortnightly)
- Founder: Alfred Evan Charlton
- First issue: February 1967
- Final issue: August 1977
- Company: The Statesman
- Country: India
- Based in: Calcutta, West Bengal
- Language: English

JS (originally Junior Statesman) was an Indian English-language youth magazine published from Calcutta by The Statesman from February 1967 until August 1977. Edited by Desmond Doig, it began as a weekly and later became a fortnightly.

JS is described as India's first youth magazine and as an influential forum for urban Indian youth culture in the late 1960s and 1970s. It covered music, fashion, film, campus life, and youth culture.

== History ==
The magazine originated as a project of Alfred Evan Charlton, the last British editor of The Statesman, who wanted a publication that would attract younger readers to the newspaper. Before leaving India in late 1966, Charlton recruited Doig, then an assistant editor at The Statesman, to lead the new magazine.

In February 1967, the first issue of the magazine was published with the Beatles on its cover. At that time, it was aimed at readers aged about 10 to 12, in keeping with Charlton's original brief. Within about six months, however, Doig had redirected the magazine toward older readers and the publication evolved from Junior Statesman into the magazine remembered simply as JS.

In 1997, its circulation peaked at 40,000 copies. Although it was originally launched as a weekly, but by 1976, due to printing delays, it was forced to become a fortnightly magazine. The magazine closed in August 1977.

In 2016, bound volumes of the magazine were rediscovered in the former Mumbai office of The Statesman and scanned, which helped to preserve a partial archive of issues from 1970 to 1977.

== Content ==
JS used the strapline "For people who think young". Its editorial mix combined music, fashion, lifestyle and youth-issues reporting with comics, posters, short fiction, crosswords, horoscopes and sports coverage. It was an early Indian example of youth-oriented "infotainment", and it cultivated an interactive relationship with readers through campus correspondents, reader participation, and advertising specific to its audience.

Among its recurring features were Dubby Bhagat's music column Disc-Cussion, Jug Suraiya's Rear Window, and Kookie Kol, a witty reader-oriented feature associated with the sisters Papiya and Tuk Tuk Ghosh. The magazine was also known for its pop-art graphics, illustrated layouts and fold-out posters.

== Writers ==
- Dubby Bhagat
- Desmond Doig, Anglo-Irish journalist
- Jug Suraiya, former associate editor of the Times of India
- M. J. Akbar, Indian politician
- Shashi Tharoor, Indian politician
- Anurag Mathur, Indian journalist
- Bhaskar "Papa" Menon, writer of Bounder column
