= Raja Ram Mohan Roy Award =

Yearly award given by the Press Council of India

- Awarded for: Excellence in journalism
- Date: 2013; 13 years ago
- Location: New Delhi, India
- Presented by: Press Council of India
- Reward: 1 lakh rupee
- First award: 2013
- Final award: 2020
- Most recently awarded to: Anne Bhavani Koteswara Prasad
- Website: presscouncil.nic.in

The Raja Ram Mohan Roy Award is a yearly award given by the Press Council of India for those who have made the most excellence in journalism in India. It was presented at an annual event in New Delhi on 16 November, the occasion of India's National Press Day. It is one of the "National Award for Excellence in Journalism" in various fields established by Press Council of India in 2012 and awarded since 2013, the other fields include Rural journalism, Development report, Photo journalism, Best newspaper art, Sports reporting, Gender Based Reporting, and Financial Reporting, etc.

The first Raja Ram Mohan Roy Award was awarded to Santosh Kumar of India Today and C.K. Sivanandan of Malayala Manorama in recognition of his outstanding contribution to investigative journalism. The award is administered by the Press Council of India and is considered India's most prestigious award that a journalist can receive in journalism. As of 2020, a total of 8 individuals have been awarded the Award.

== Awardees ==
- 2012: None
- 2013: Santosh Kumar, India Today, C.K. Sivanandan, Malayala Manorama
- 2014: None
- 2015: None
- 2016: S Nihal Singh, veteran journalist
- 2017: Sam Najappa, journalist, Sarat Mishra, journalist
- 2018: N Ram, The Hindu
- 2019: Gulab Kothari, Rajasthan Patrika
- 2020: Anne Bhavani Koteswara Prasad
