= Mark Hunter (civil servant) =

Sir John Mark Somers Hunter (1865 – 20 September 1932) was a schoolmaster in India and the author of school textbooks of English literature. He was the director of Coimbatore College and professor of Presidency College, Madras; then professor at Government College, Yangon (Rangoon) (1918–1920) and chairman of the commission to establish a university and director of public instruction of Burma under British rule. On 12 July 1920, he put forward the law for this purpose in the governing council. The law being enacted, Rangoon University was established in December and Hunter was made a professor of the university. About 1930, he became a fellow of the Indian Empire Society.

== Works ==
- Politics and Character in Shakespeare's "Julius Caesar" (1931)
- Spelling Reform: Warranted by History(1930)

=== Work as an editor ===
- Hero as Man of Letters by Thomas Carlyle (1897), introduction and notes by Mark Hunter.
- Hero as Divinity by Thomas Carlyle (1907), introduction and notes by Mark Hunter.
- De Quincey's Revolt of the Tartars and, the English Mail-Coach by Thomas De Quincey (1895), introduction and notes by Mark Hunter and Cecil M. Barrow.
- De Quincey's Confessions of an English Opium-eater by Thomas De Quincey (1922), introduction and notes by Mark Hunter.

== Bibliography ==
- Aye Kyaw, The Voice of Young Burma (Singapore: Institute of Southeast Asian Studies, 1993) pp. 17–18, 31.
