= Winston Churchill: His Times, His Crimes =

Book by British-Pakistani Tariq Ali

- First edition
- Author: Tariq Ali
- Language: English
- Published: London
- Publisher: Verso Books
- Publication date: May 2022
- Publication place: United Kingdom
- Media type: Hardback
- Pages: 448
- ISBN: 9781788735773

Winston Churchill: His Times, His Crimes is a 2022 book by British-Pakistani writer, journalist, political activist and historian Tariq Ali. In it, Ali discusses Winston Churchill's racial and imperialist views.

== Synopsis ==
The book is described as "A coruscating portrait of Britain’s greatest imperialist" by its publisher Verso.

== Reception ==
Historian Andrew Roberts was highly critical of the book, stating that the book "makes so many basic factual errors that Churchill’s reputation emerges unscathed from this onslaught", and that the "quality of Ali’s research is so execrable that he even cites the fictional TV series Peaky Blinders as a source". Similarly, Simon Heffer, writing in The Daily Telegraph, argues that Ali "fails to consider the historical context" and "seems to mount a class analysis of Churchill's wickedness, but he never really succeeds", albeit concurring that Churchill "was a racist".

Writing for Prospect, Priyamvada Gopal welcomed the book, noting that it "draws on more honest existing historical scholarship than most popular biographies of Churchill" and portrays Churchill as "profoundly authoritarian, with a soft spot for fascist strongmen, and a hostility to working-class assertion." In Current Affairs, Alex Skopic commended the book for calling more attention to Churchill's broader political career than simply to his actions during the Second World War, which "allows Ali to place Churchill in a more complete world-historical context", giving special commendation to the chapters on the Bengal famine of 1943 and the Mau Mau rebellion.
