= Political positions of Winston Churchill =

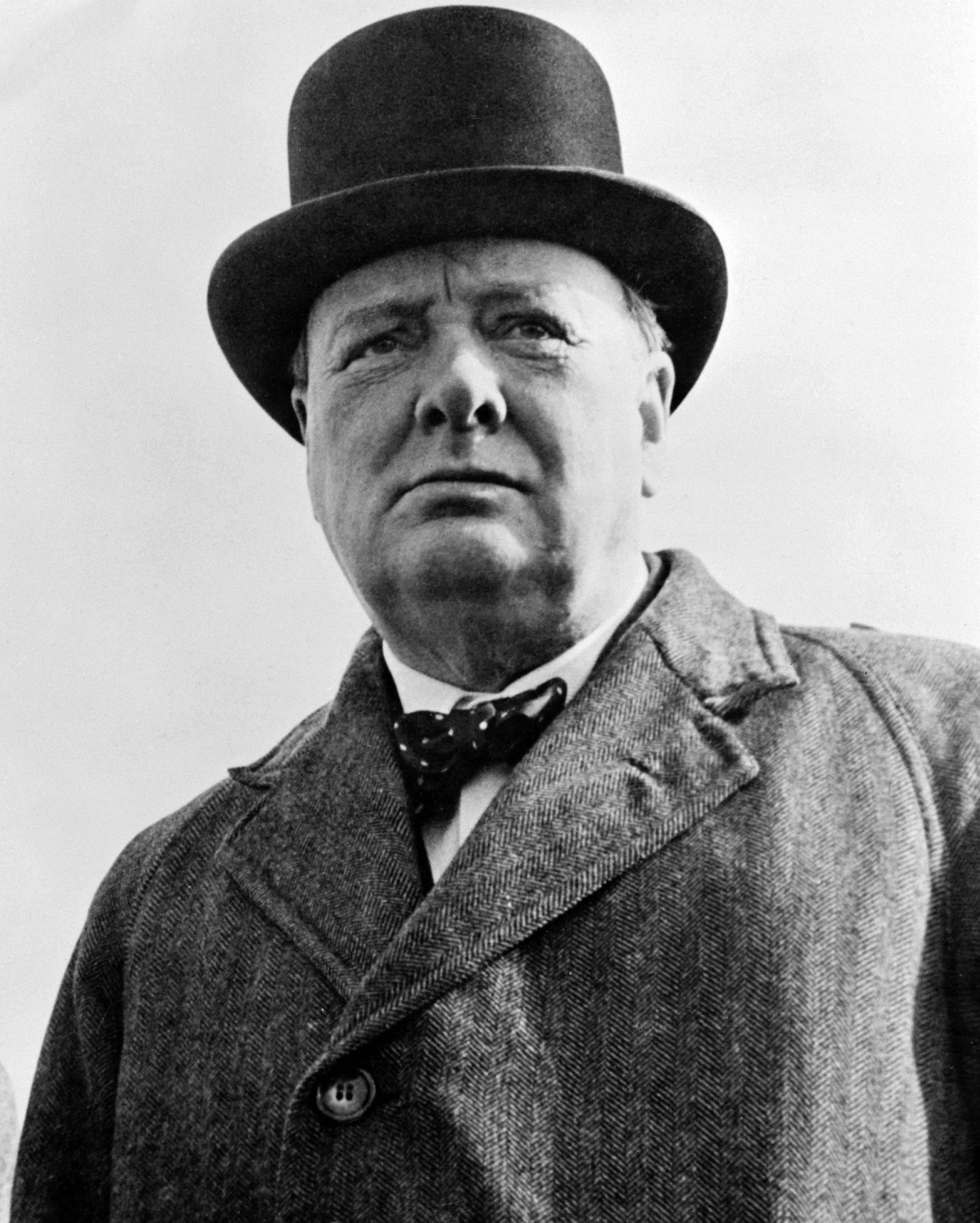
Churchill in 1942

In 20th century politics, Winston Churchill (1874–1965) was one of the world's most influential and significant figures. He was Prime Minister of the United Kingdom from 1940 to 1945, when he led the country to victory in the Second World War, and again from 1951 to 1955. Apart from two years between 1922 and 1924, he was a Member of Parliament (MP) from 1900 to 1964. Ideologically an economic liberal and imperialist, he was for most of his career a member of the Conservative Party, and its leader from 1940 to 1955. He was a member of the Liberal Party from 1904 to 1924.

Fundamentally, Churchill was an anti-socialist and a believer of individual liberty and the free market. However, he was also a supporter of trade unionism, which he saw as the "antithesis" of socialism. He has been described as exhibiting a paternalist attitude for the less fortunate in society. He was also a staunch monarchist and a supporter of the British Empire. He opposed the dissolution of the Empire through the granting of self-government to its subjects, including dominion status for India. He opposed the partition of Ireland and supported Britain's membership of a United Europe, which would also include a unified European Army.

== Fundamental ideology ==
The historian Roger Hermiston writes that, when forming his national coalition government in May 1940, it helped Churchill that his own career had "never been circumscribed by party affiliation". He had begun as a Conservative, defected to the Liberals for twenty years and then returned to the Conservatives. Stuart Ball asserts that he was always comfortable with the idea of governing coalitions. Churchill was perceived by some observers to have been largely motivated by personal ambition rather than political principle, and he lacked "permanent commitment to any party". While Robert Rhodes James wrote that Churchill was "fundamentally a very conservative man", Martin Gilbert considered him to be always "liberal in outlook".

Roy Jenkins believed that, whether Churchill was conservative or liberal, he invariably opposed socialism, except that he was completely reliant on the help and support of his Labour Party ministers in the wartime coalition. Churchill was wary of socialist tendencies toward state planning and bureaucracy, because he consistently believed in both the liberty of the individual and of free markets. Paul Addison asserts, however, that Churchill was paradoxically supportive of trade unionism, which he saw as the "antithesis of socialism". While Churchill was in some respects a radical and a reformer, it was not from any desire to challenge existing social structure, but to preserve it. He could not empathise with the poor, so instead he sympathised with them, displaying what Addison calls the attitude of a "benevolent paternalist".

== Monarchism ==
Although Churchill upset both Edward VII and George V during his political career, he was firmly monarchist. Jenkins says Churchill "exhibited a romanticised view of the British monarchy", and this was especially so in his warm regard for Elizabeth II. His loyalty to Edward VIII almost ruined his political career but, following the abdication, Churchill immediately transferred his loyalty to George VI with whom, despite some initial reservations on the King's side, he formed a close relationship during World War II.

== Imperialism ==
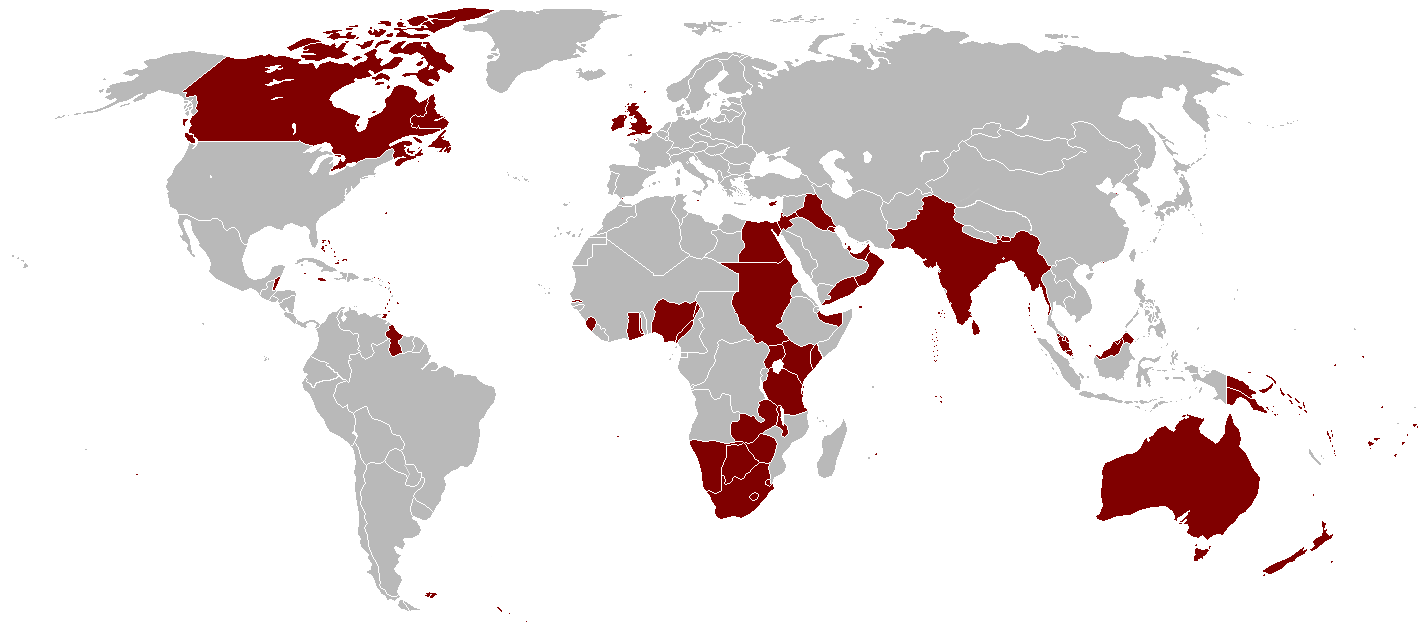
British Empire at its territorial peak in 1921.

Churchill was always an imperialist, with the American historian Edward Adams characterising him as an adherent of "liberal imperialism". Jenkins says that, as with the monarchy, Churchill held and displayed a romanticised view of the British Empire. Addison says he saw British imperialism as a form of altruism that benefited its subject peoples because "by conquering and dominating other peoples, the British were also elevating and protecting them". To Churchill, the idea of dismantling the Empire by transferring power to its subject peoples was anathema – especially manifested in his opposition to the Government of India Act 1935 and his acerbic comments about Mahatma Gandhi, whom he called "a seditious Middle Temple lawyer, now posing as a fakir".

== Racial views ==
Some critics have equated Churchill's imperialism with racialism, but Addison among others has argued that it is misleading to describe him as a racist in any modern context because the term as used now bears "many connotations which were alien to Churchill". Addison points out that Churchill opposed anti-Semitism and would never have tried "to stoke up racial animosity against immigrants, or to persecute minorities". In 1921, as Secretary of State for the Colonies, Churchill travelled to Mandatory Palestine where he declared himself to be a supporter of Zionism and refused to prohibit Jewish migration to Palestine.

Against that, Churchill did make some disparaging remarks about Indians, though essentially directed at Gandhi and the Indian National Congress party and secessionists generally. However, Churchill was driven in this antipathy by imperialism, not by racism. He was angered in autumn 1930 by the Labour government's decision to grant Dominion status to India. He argued that it would hasten calls for full independence from the British Empire. He joined the Indian Empire Society which opposed the granting of Dominion status. In his view, India was not ready for home rule because he believed that the Hindu Brahmin caste would gain control and further oppress both the "untouchables" and the religious minorities. In March 1931, when riots broke out in Cawnpore between Hindus and Muslims, he claimed that the situation proved his case.

== Other political views ==
=== European unity ===
Churchill was an early proponent of pan-Europeanism, having written an article in 1930 calling for a "United States of Europe", although he at the time envisaged this being without Britain, writing that Britain must be "with Europe but not of it". After the Second World War, in a speech in Zurich in 1946, he famously called for a United States of Europe, with Britain and its Commonwealth being simply "friends and sponsors of the new Europe”

But as the first steps to European unity were taken, and as the new realities of Britain's shrunken role in the world sank in, Churchill changed his position. He advocated the creation of a united Europe that would include Britain. He lent his considerable personal prestige to the Congress of Europe in 1948 in The Hague, where he called for the 16 democratic European countries, "including Great Britain, linked with her Empire and Commonwealth", to start building Europe, aiming “at the union of Europe as a whole”. In referring to the progress which had been made in the year and a half since his Zurich speech, Churchill declared “sixteen European states are now associated for economic purposes, five have entered into close economic and military relationship. We hope that this nucleus will in due course be joined by the people of Scandinavia and of the Iberian Peninsula as well as by Italy….” With Britain not merely among the sixteen but among the five, he was, in the words of his biographer Roy Jenkins “obviously then regarding his country as not merely part of Europe but part of its core”.

In Strasbourg, in 1949, he said to the Parliamentary Assembly of the Council of Europe: "we [including Britain] are engaged in the process of creating a European unit in the world." He supported that Assembly drafting proposals for a European Constitution, quoting Napoleon in saying that "a constitution must be short and obscure". In 1950, he used the same platform to call for "the immediate creation of a European Army under a unified command, and in which we should all bear a worthy and honourable part", this army to be "subject to proper European democratic control and acting in full cooperation with the USA and Canada". In November 1951, he called for a "United Europe" in a Cabinet paper, but "his foreign secretary and successor as Prime Minister, Anthony Eden, was not a ‘keen European’ and his Europeanism became lost as his health and energy failed".

In 1961, when Harold Macmillan applied to join the European Economic Community (EEC), Churchill wrote to his Conservative Association in support.

=== Ireland ===
Churchill always opposed partition of Ireland. As a minister in 1913 and again in 1921, he suggested that Ulster have some autonomy from an independent Irish government, but was always opposed by Ulster Unionists. As Leader of the Opposition, he told John W. Dulanty and Frederick Boland, successive Irish ambassadors to London, that he still hoped for a united Ireland.
