= S Nihal Singh =

Indian journalist, foreign correspondent, columnist and newspaper editor

Surendra Nihal Singh (April 30, 1929 - April 16, 2018 ), commonly referred to as S Nihal Singh, was an Indian journalist, foreign correspondent, columnist and newspaper editor. He remained the editor of The Statesman, The Indian Express, Indian Post and Khaleej Times. As a foreign correspondent mostly for the Statesman and later for Khaleej Times, he was posted in Moscow, London, the US, Netherlands, Singapore, Pakistan and Indonesia and, in time, became known for his commentary on national affairs, foreign policy and international affairs.

He is most noted for his coverage of the Indo-Pakistani war of 1965, and his role in opposing the Emergency (1975–77) imposed by then prime minister Indira Gandhi, while he was editor of the Statesman. At that time, it famously published a black front page as a mark of protest. For this, he was awarded the prestigious International Editor of the Year Award in 1978 by World Press Review, New York. In 1994, he became the president of the Press Club of India, and later Director, Press Institute of India. In 2016, he was awarded the Raja Ram Mohan Roy Award for 'outstanding contribution to journalism', given by the Press Council of India

== Career ==
At age 18, his first article was published in The Tribune. He started his career in 1951 as a sub-editor with The Times of India. This was followed by a two-and-a-half decade-long stint with The Statesman. Starting as a staff reporter with The Statesman, Calcutta (Now Kolkata) eventually became its Resident Editor in 1973 and Chief Editor in Kolkata in 1975. A short stint as Editor-in-Chief of The Indian Express (1981–82) led to becoming the founding editor of The Indian Post, Mumbai, in 1987. After it closed, he became the Editor of the Khaleej Times, Dubai (1994). During this stint, he was again a foreign correspondent in many countries.

Once he returned to Delhi, he remained a syndicated columnist well into his late 80s, with several publications, including The Tribune and Asian Age. In 2011, he was awarded the Lifetime Achievement Award for his outstanding contributions to the field, by Indian Journalists' Association in UK In the same year, he published his autobiography Ink In My Veins – A life in journalism.

During a career spanning several decades, he wrote 14 books, including The Rocky Road to Indian Democracy: Nehru to Narasimha Rao, The Yogi and the Bear: A Study of Indo-Soviet Relations’', ‘'Ink in My Veins: A Life in Journalism (autobiography ) and The Gang and 900 Million: A China Diary.

== Personal life ==
He was born in Rawalpindi to Gurmukh Nihal Singh, who remained the Chief Minister of Delhi (1955-1956) and later Governor of Rajasthan, and Lachchmi (Devi) Singh. After finishing his school, he did his Bachelors degree with Honours from Delhi University in 1948.

He died in New Delhi, after suffering from renal failure for several months, at age 89. He is survived by his sister-in-law Indoo Nihal Singh and two sisters, Tej Khanna and Satwant Pritam Singh. His wife, a Dutch national, died much before in the 1990s, the couple had no children. Upon his death, noted newspaper editor and former Rajya Sabha MP, H.K. Dua called him the “last of the liberal, democratic editors”. A Hindustan Times obituary called him a "pioneer in journalism".

== Books ==
- From The Jhelum To The Volga. Nachiketa Pub., 1972.
- Malaysia -- a commentary. New York, Barnes & Noble, 1971. ISBN 0389045799.
- Indira's India : a political notebook. Nachiketa Publ, 1978.
- The Gang and 900 Million: A China Diary. Oxford. 1979.
- My India. Vikas Publishing House, 1982. ISBN 0706917707.
- The Rise and Fall of UNESCO. Riverdale Co Pub, 1988. ISBN 0913215309.
- The Yogi and the Bear: Story of Indo-Soviet Relations. Riverdale Co Pub, 1988. ISBN 0913215120.
- Indian Days Indian Nights. South Asia Books, 1990. ISBN 8170312477.
- Count Down to Elections. Allied Publishers, 1991. ISBN 8170232740.
- Your Slip Is Showing: Indian Press Today. South Asia Books, 1992. ISBN 8185674159.
- I Discover America. Chanakya Publications, 1993. ISBN 8170010950.
- The Rocky Road of Indian Democracy: Nehru to Narasimha Rao. Sterling Pub, 1993. ISBN 8120715268.
- Blood and Sand - The West Asian Tragedy. CBS, 2003. ISBN 9788123909592.
- People And Places, 2009. Shubhi Publications. ISBN 8182901987.
- Ink in My Veins: A Life in Journalism. Hay House, 2011. ISBN 9381431019.
- The Modi Myth. Paranjoy Guha Thakurta. 2015. ISBN 9789384439545.
- Love in the Time of Emergency. Authors Upfront. 2017 ISBN 9384439967.
