= Dainik Statesman =

Bengali-language daily newspaper in India

- Front page of Dainik Statesman
- Owner: The Statesman Group
- Founder: The Statesman Group
- Publisher: Vineet Gupta
- Editor: Shekhar Sengupta
- Founded: 28 June 2004; 22 years ago
- Language: Bengali
- Headquarters: 4, Chowringhee Square, Kolkata – 700001
- City: Kolkata, Siliguri, Durgapur
- Country: India
- Sister newspapers: The Statesman
- Website: www.dainikstatesmannews.com
- Free online archives: epaper.thestatesman.com

Dainik Statesman is a Bengali daily newspaper run by The Statesman group with its central office being The Statesman House at Chowringhee. Dainik Statesman started circulation from 28 June 2004.

The newspaper became more popular after the Singur and Nandigram clashes since 2006 when The Statesman group and more specifically the Bengali version, Dainik Statesman presented the views of those opposed to land-acquisition whereas the ABP group was more interested in presenting the views of those who were for land being acquired forcibly. Special issues of this paper are — Khetkhamar, Gallery, Biggan o Projukti, Sorir o Sastho, Bitorko, Berano, Bongodarpan, Anno Bhabna Porshi desh, Boier Ondore Biswobarta, Khushir Uran, Silpo o Banijjo. Every Saturday entertainment related special issue – Binodon, Sunday special – Bichitra are also very popular to daily readers.

== Digital presence ==
In addition to its print edition, Dainik Statesman operates a Bengali-language digital news platform, Dainik Statesman News, which provides coverage of West Bengal, national and international news, politics, business, sports, entertainment, lifestyle and other subjects.

The digital platform publishes breaking news, feature stories, opinion pieces, interviews and multimedia content, including videos and photo galleries. The website serves readers in India and abroad through its online portal and social media platforms.

| website = www.dainikstatesmannews.com | free = Official website

Dainik Statesman is a Bengali-language daily newspaper published by The Statesman Group. Founded in 2004 and headquartered in Kolkata, the newspaper is published from Kolkata, Siliguri and Durgapur. In addition to its print edition, the publication operates the Bengali digital news portal Dainik Statesman News, offering news and multimedia coverage on regional, national and international affairs.
