= India Defence League =

The India Defence League was a British pressure group founded in June 1933 dedicated to keeping India within the British Empire.

It grew from the parliamentary India Defence Committee and was founded with the support of 10 Privy Councillors, 28 peers, 57 MPs, 2 former Governors and 3 former Lieutenant-Governors of Indian provinces and including members of the armed forces and the judiciary. Viscount Sumner was its Honorary President, with Lord Carson, Rudyard Kipling, Winston Churchill, Sir Henry Page-Croft, the Marquess of Hartington, and Viscount FitzAlan holding the Vice-Presidencies. It eventually had over 100 peers as members.

The IDL also helped Admiral Keyes win the Portsmouth North by-election in 1934.

== See also ==
- Indian Empire Society
