= Ian Stephens (editor) =

British journalist (1903–1984)

- Born: 1903; London
- Died: 28 March 1984 (aged 80–81)
- Occupation: Editor
- Known for: Editor of the Indian newspaper The Statesman from 1942 to 1951

Ian Melville Stephens CIE (1903 – 28 March 1984) was a British journalist who was the editor of the Indian newspaper The Statesman (then British-owned) in Kolkata, West Bengal, from 1942 to 1951. He became known for his independent reporting during British rule in India, and in particular for his decision to publish graphic photographs, in August 1943, of the Bengal famine of 1943, which claimed between 1.5 and 3 million lives. The publication of the images, along with Stephens' editorials, helped to bring the famine to an end by persuading the British government to supply adequate relief to the victims.

When Stephens died, Amartya Sen wrote in a letter to The Times: "In the subcontinent in which Ian Stephens spent a substantial part of his life, he is remembered not only as a great editor (with amiable, if somewhat eccentric, manners), but also as someone whose hard-fought campaign possibly saved the lives of hundreds of thousands of people."

== Early life and education ==
Born in London, the first son of Euphemia Elizabeth Cornwall Stephens (née Glasfurd) and John Alexander Melville Stephens, Stephens was brought up with his younger brother, D'Arcy Melville Stephens, in the Old Parsonage in Fleet, Hampshire, where the family lived with several servants. His father had worked in the tea industry; he described his profession in 1911 as a retired "tea planter". The family on his mother's side had strong military and Indian connections: Stephens' maternal grandfather, Charles Glasfurd, had been Deputy Commissioner in the Central Provinces of British India, and his mother's paternal grandfather was Major-General John Glasfurd of the Bengal Army.

After attending Winchester College, Stephens won an exhibition (a type of scholarship) to King's College, Cambridge, in 1921, where he graduated with first-class honours in natural sciences and history. In 1929 D'Arcy Stephens married Isobel McGowan, daughter of Sir Harry McGowan, the chairman of Imperial Chemical Industries; Ian was best man at the wedding. D'Arcy died in November 1942 on HMS Ibis.

== Career ==
=== Move to India ===
After Cambridge, Stephens worked for the London Underground and as Ernest Debenham's private secretary. In 1930 he joined the Bureau of Public Information in Delhi, India, and from 1932 to 1937 worked as its director. After this he moved to The Statesman in Kolkata (then Calcutta), first as assistant editor, then in 1942 as editor, succeeding Arthur Moore. According to his obituary in The Times, for which he also wrote, he displayed "independent judgment and wide knowledge gained from travel", as well as a "flair for descriptive writing".

=== Famine photographs ===
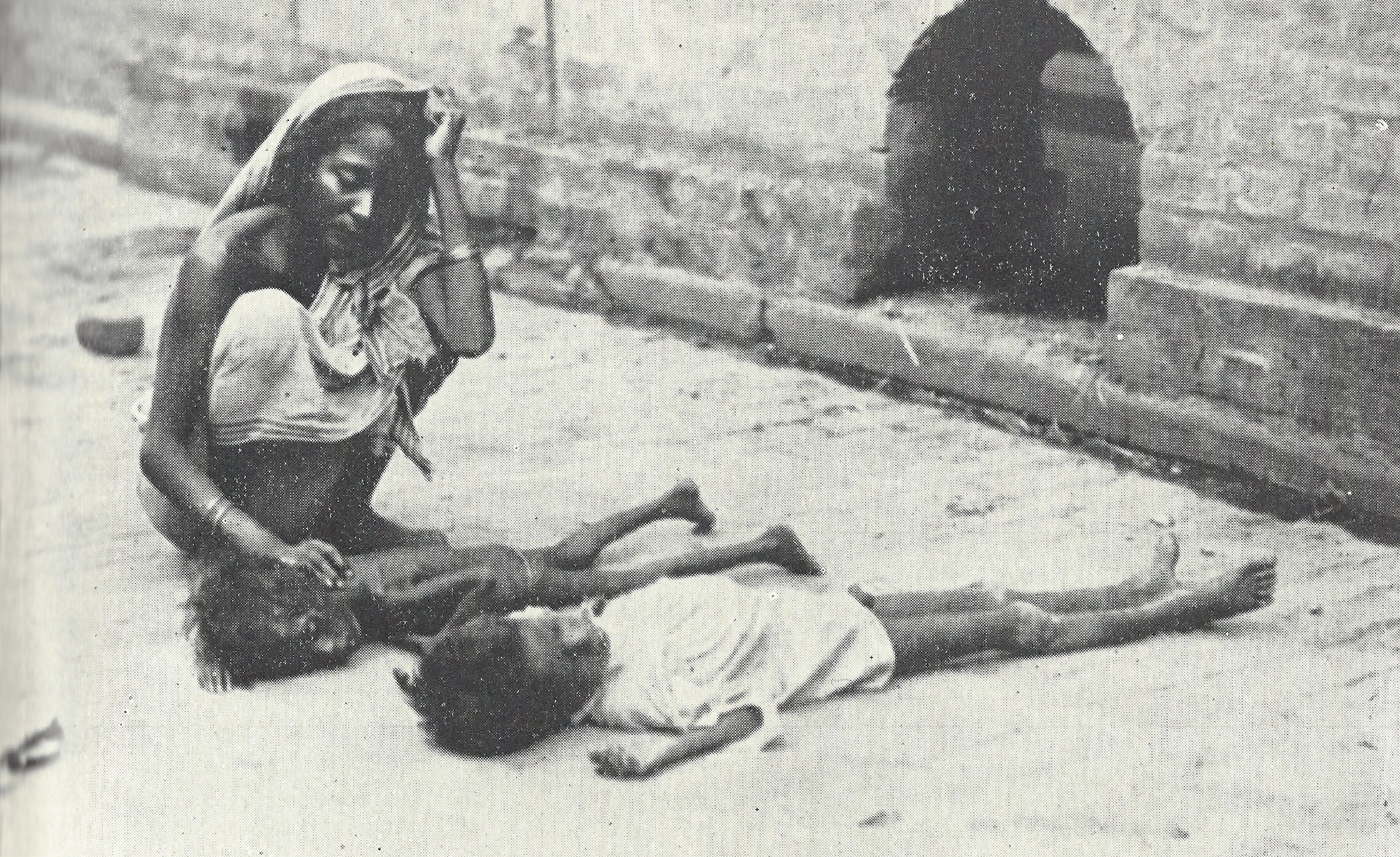
Published by Stephens in The Statesman on 22 August 1943

When famine threatened Bengal in 1943, the British government downplayed the situation, talking of food shortages rather than famine; Leo Amery, the British Secretary of State for India, appeared to believe that propaganda might avert a crisis by discouraging hoarding. For months Stephens and The Statesman went along with this, writes Cormac Ó Gráda, "toe[ing] the official line, berating local traders and producers, and praising ministerial efforts". Referring to the situation as "famine" was prohibited under "Emergency Rules", anything "deemed damaging to the war effort" was restricted.

From August 1943 Stephens began a "relentless battle for eight weeks" to show his urban readers in Kolkata (then Calcutta) that the famine was real. Photographs were not obviously covered by the Emergency Rules, so Stephens sent photographers out to take images of the victims. Their publication was widely regarded as "a singular act of journalistic courage and conscientiousness," according to the historian Janam Mukherjee, "without which many more lives would have surely been lost".

Some of the photographs Stephens regarded as "utterly unpublishable", but he ran several others on Sunday, 22 August 1943. "In some definite sense," writes Mukherjee, "the event ever since known as the 'Bengal Famine of 1943' had been born." The following Sunday, 29 August, Stephens published more photographs and an editorial, "All-India Disgrace". In Calcutta alone, "[s]cores of persons collapsing from under-nourishment are daily picked up from the streets," he wrote. "[R]ecorded deaths from starvation cases in hospitals between August 16 and August 29 were 143; 155 dead bodies are known to have been removed from public thoroughfares by the authorities' new Corpse Disposal Squad during the ten days ending on August 24." Things were significantly worse in the rural areas (the mofussil). According to the historian Zareer Masani, Stephens had a visiting card made with four images of the victims printed on one side. "He took the train to Delhi with three hundred of these cards and made sure that every senior government official got this token from him." When Stephens visited Calcutta again in 1975, people old enough to recognize him thanked him in the street, Masani writes: "Are you Ian Stephens, the editor? Thank you for what you did for Bengal!"

=== Return to England ===
Stephens resigned from The Statesman in 1951 after disagreeing with the Indian government over its policy in Kashmir. He spent time in Kashmir and Pakistan, then returned to England and a six-year fellowship at King's College, Cambridge, which he used to write Horned Moon (1953) about his travels.

== Selected works ==
- (8 August 1943). "Plight of a Province", The Statesman (editorial).
- (29 August 1943). "All-India Disgrace", The Statesman (editorial).
- (14 October 1943). "Seen from a distance", The Statesman (editorial).
- (16 October 1943). "The death-roll", The Statesman (editorial).
- (1953). Horned Moon: An Account of a Journey Through Pakistan, Kashmir, And Afghanistan. London: Chatto & Windus.
- (1963). Pakistan. London: Praeger.
- (1966). Monsoon Morning. London: Ernest Benn.
- (1977). Unmade Journey. London: Stacey International.

== See also ==
- Distant Thunder (1973)
- Churchill's Secret War (2010)
