= Statesman Vintage & Classic Car Rally =

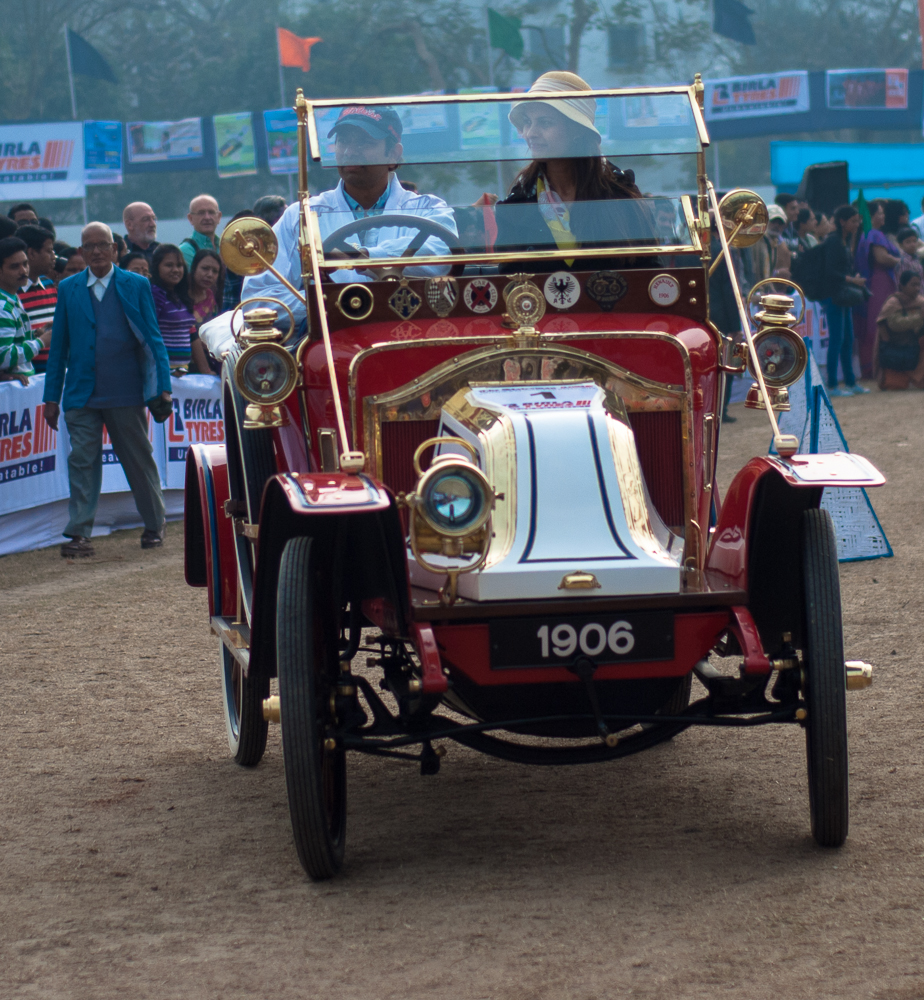
- Renault Frères 1906
- Dates: January in Kolkata, February in New Delhi
- Frequency: annual
- Locations: New Delhi, Kolkata
- Inaugurated: 1964/1968

The Statesman Vintage & Classic Car Rally is an annual vintage car rally in New Delhi and Kolkata and the oldest, continuously-run such event in India and the sub-continent. It started in the year 1964 in New Delhi, and was brought to Kolkata in the year 1968 as The Statesman Vintage Car Rally. It is now known as The Statesman Vintage & Classic Car Rally. The main organiser of this event is The Statesman. The major attractions of the event are assembly of vintage and classic cars, followed by a drive through the city where cars are assessed for originality and performance on the road section; display of period and fancy dress; grand parade and live music.

The 50th Statesman rally in New Delhi was held on 28 February 2016 (two rallies in intervening years did not take place, because of the 1971 war and the 1973 fuel crisis).

== Statesman vintage and classic car rally 2014 ==
This event took place on 19 January 2014, at 9 A.M. after the flag-off by the Army commander. All the cars assembled in the Command sports stadium, Fort William, Kolkata.

== Statesman vintage and classic car rally 2015 ==
This event took place on 11 January 2015, at 8 A.M. after the flag off by the Army commander. All the cars assembled in the Command sports stadium, Fort William, Kolkata. Total 186 Participants took part there.

== Statesman vintage and classic car rally 2016 ==
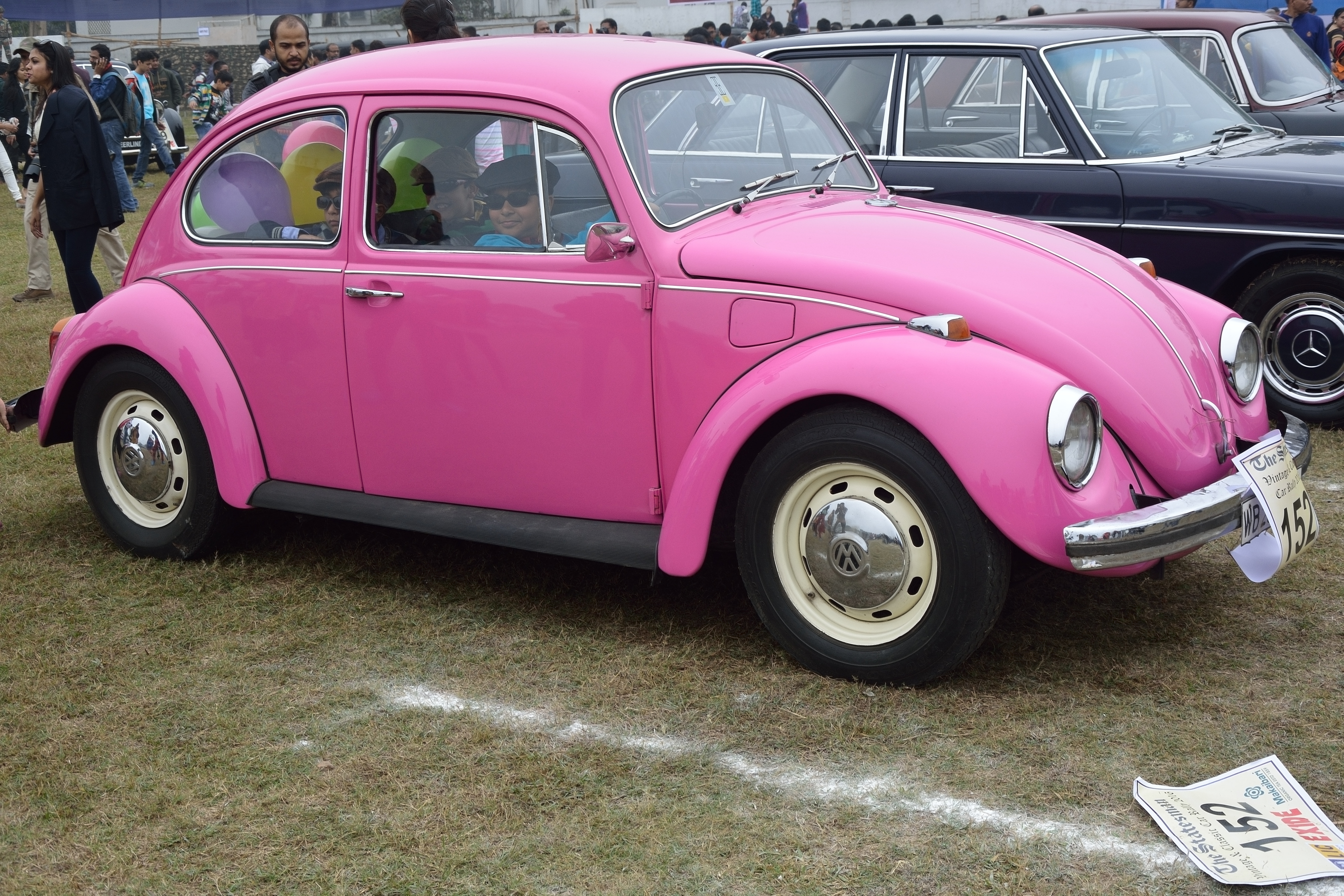
The Statesman Vintage & Classic Car Rally 2016

The 50th rally took place on 28 February 2016.

== Statesman vintage and classic car rally 2017 ==
The 2017 rally was held on 26 February involving over a hundred cars. Pre judging took place on 24–25 February.
