= The Statesman (India) =

Indian English-language daily newspaper

- People's Parliament, Always in Session

- Front page (8 August 2022)
- Type: Daily newspaper
- Format: Broadsheet
- Owner(s): RP Gupta; The Statesman Ltd.
- Editor: Ravindra Kumar
- Founded: 1818; 207 years ago (75867 issues)
- Political alignment: Liberal
- Language: English
- Headquarters: 4 Chowringhee Square, Kolkata, 700001
- Circulation: 234,000 Daily; 250,000 Sunday
- Sister newspapers: Dainik Statesman
- OCLC number: 1772961
- Website: www.thestatesman.com

The Statesman is an Indian English-language broadsheet daily newspaper founded in 1818 and published simultaneously in Kolkata, New Delhi, Siliguri and Bhubaneswar. It incorporates and is directly descended from The Friend of India. It is owned by The Statesman Ltd and headquartered at Statesman House, Chowringhee Square, Kolkata, with its national editorial office at Statesman House, Connaught Place, New Delhi. It is a member of the Asia News Network.

The Statesman has an average weekday circulation of approximately 234,000, and the Sunday Statesman has a circulation of 250,000. This ranks it as one of the leading English newspapers in West Bengal, India.

== History ==
The Statesman is a direct descendant of two newspapers, the Bombay (now Mumbai) based Indian Statesman and The Friend of India published in Calcutta (now Kolkata). Indian Statesman was started by Robert Knight, who was previously the principal founder and editor of The Times of India. Knight merged the two papers to Indian Statesman and New Friend of India on 15 January 1875. The paper later adopted the current name. It absorbed its erstwhile rival The Englishman in 1927. The Statesman was managed by a British corporate group until it transferred ownership to a consortium of companies with N A Palkhivala as Chairman in the mid-1960s. The first editor assigned under this new ownership was Pran Chopra.

In 1978, then editor S Nihal Singh was awarded the prestigious International Editor of the Year Award given by World Press Review, New York, for opposing the Emergency (1975–77).

== Editorial style ==
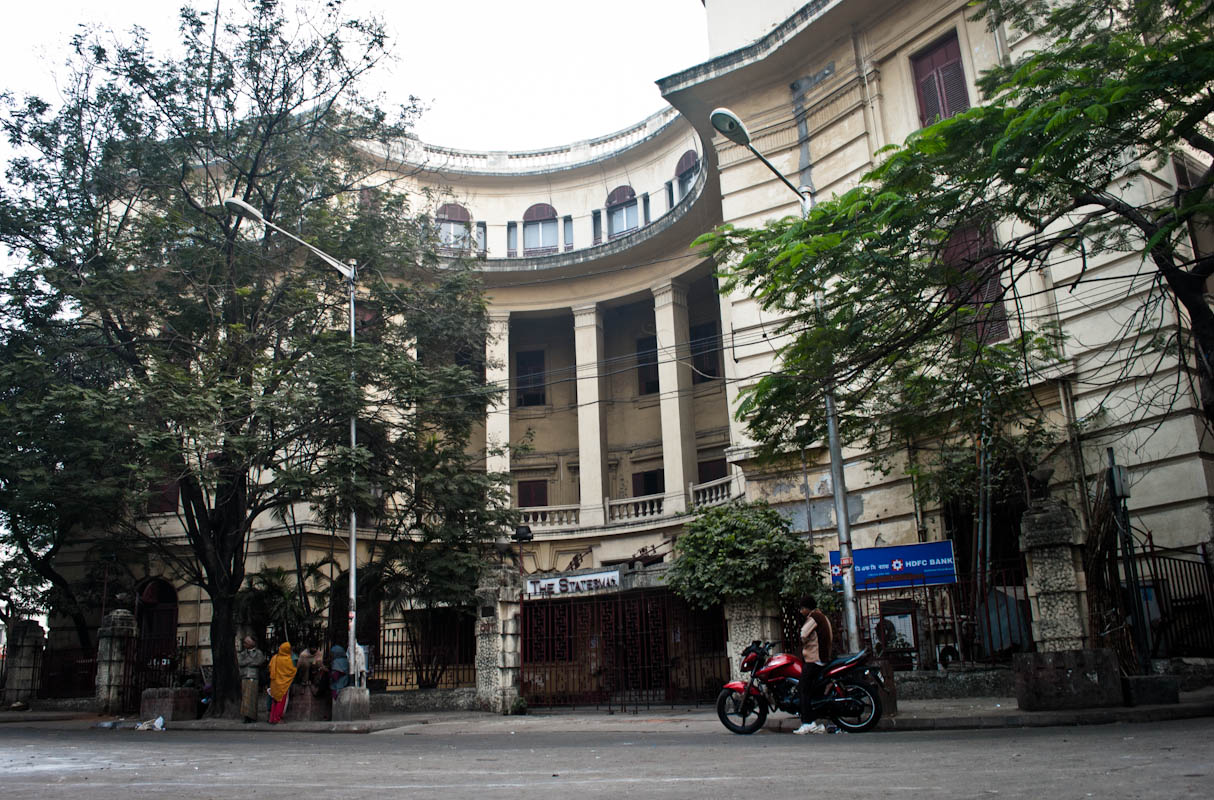
Statesman House, Kolkata

The Statesman is characterized by its terse reporting style. It holds a liberal position. It opposed the shifting of India's capital from Calcutta to New Delhi in 1911, stating that "[t]he British have gone to the city of graveyards to be buried there". It also strenuously opposed Indira Gandhi's Emergency in 1975–77. Under the editor Ian Stephens (who was editor from 1942 to 1951), the newspaper published highly disturbing images, on 22 and 29 August 1943, of the effects of the Bengal famine of 1943, despite the British colonial government's attempts at censorship. The images played a major role in changing world opinion on imperialism.

The Statesman Award for Rural Reporting is presented to outstanding journalists every year, irrespective of affiliation, to further the social uplifting of indigents from India. The awards are presented on 16 September every year, the death anniversary of Justice Sudhi Ranjan Das, former Chief Justice of India's Supreme Court and chairman of The Statesman during the tumultuous Emergency years.

Once the most widely read English dailies in West Bengal, The Statesman has now lost some ground to The Telegraph and The Times of India in the state. But it is widely regarded as the paper to read for serious news reportage, incisive analytical articles and usage of standard English language.

The Statesman is a founding member of the Asia News Network, a grouping of 22 Asian newspapers that have joined hands for a daily news exchange. This allows The Statesman to offer exhaustive coverage of all Asian regions.

== Supplements ==
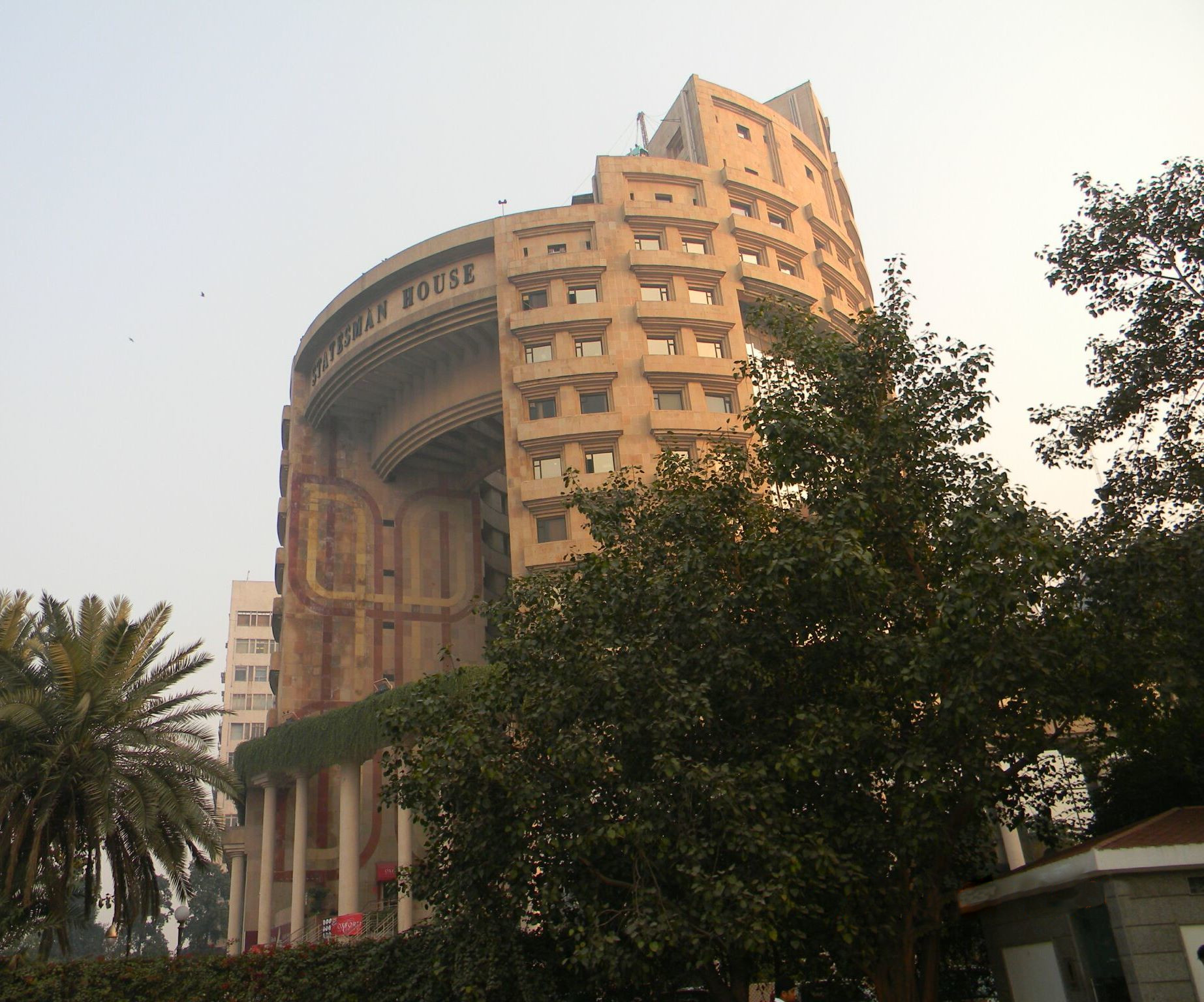
Statesman House, New Delhi

The Statesman carries a Thursday feature supplement called "Section 2" which is published from New Delhi. The four-page supplement provides in-depth analysis on art, dance, literature, drama, fashion, lifestyle and entertainment. In Kolkata, the supplement "Voices" focuses on schools and schoolchildren. It started in 1995, providing the opportunity for school children to showcase their writing skills with research articles, poems and short news clips. Among other activities every year, "Voices" hosts a 2-day long festival called "Vibes" in Calcutta, which showcases inter-school competitions in different fields, as well as shows by musicians and bands.

The Sunday supplement, "8th Day", is the major literary section of the paper, consisting of reader-contributed short stories and poems while the other Sunday supplement, "Evolve", mainly deals with the cultural scene in India. "Marquee", published every Saturday, covers the film and entertainment scene. Supplement of Dainik Statesman - every Saturday publishes Binodan where the news of art, culture, music, entertainment, food, fashion, lifestyle related articles are available. Every Sunday publishes Bichitra where the Sunday special articles, short stories, travel, children special issues are available.

== Key personnel ==
R P Gupta is Chairman and Ravindra Kumar is Editor of The Statesman. Arya Rudra is Managing Editor and Vineet Gupta is Printer and Publisher of The Statesman.

Sister Edition Dainik Statesman, a daily Bengali newspaper, was launched in June 2004 and is published simultaneously in Kolkata and Siliguri.

== Editorial incident ==
In February 2009, The Statesman editor Ravindra Kumar was arrested on the charges of "hurting the religious feelings" of Muslims. BBC reported that Muslims were upset with The Statesman for reproducing Johann Hari's article "Why should I respect these oppressive religions?" from the UK's The Independent daily in its February edition.

== Rally sponsorship ==
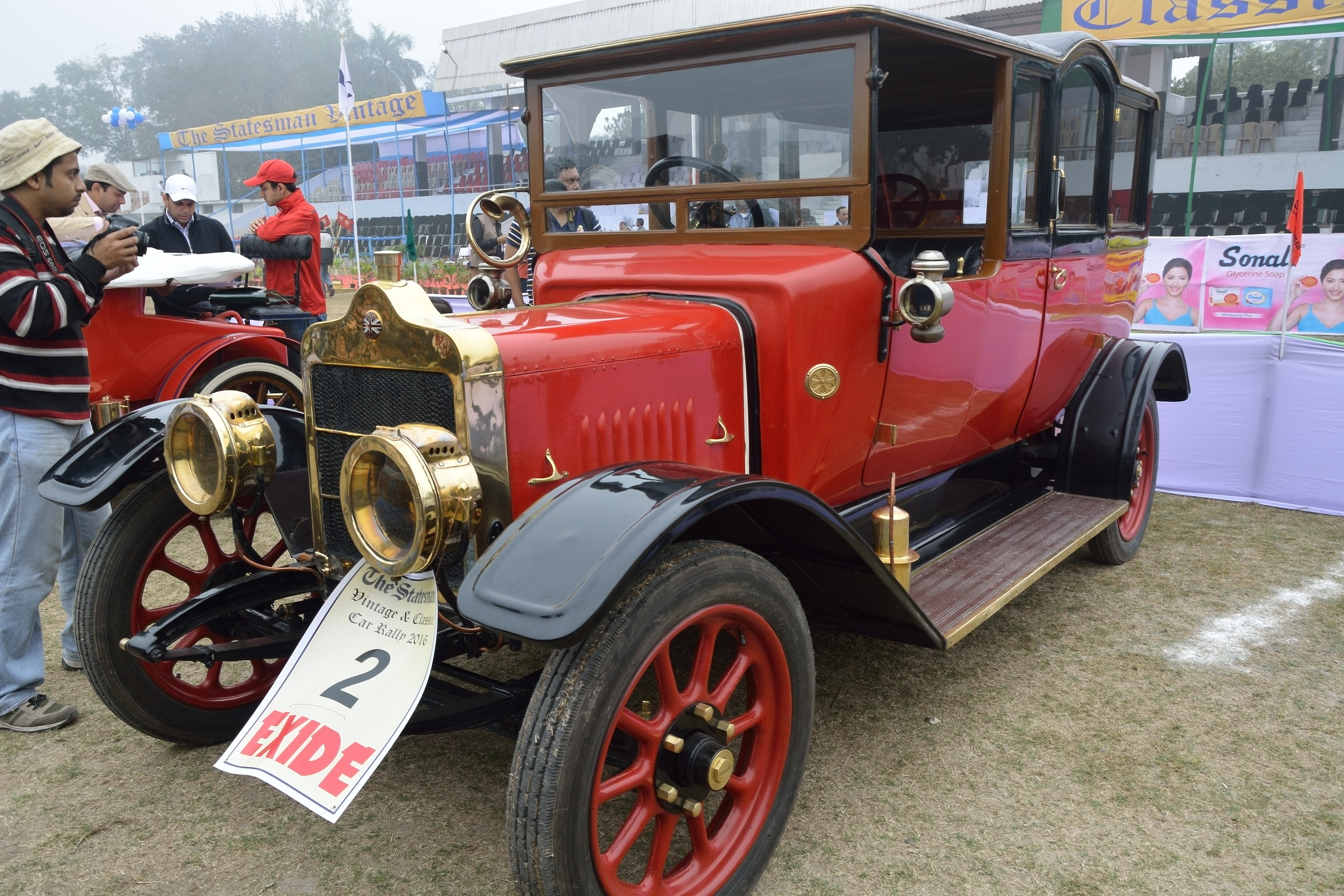
Vintage car rally, April 2016

The Statesman Vintage & Classic Car Rally has been held annually since 1964.

== See also ==
- Junior Statesman
- Dainik Statesman
- Indian English
- List of newspapers in India by circulation
- List of newspapers in the world by circulation
