= Central University of Nicaragua =

Private university in Managua, Nicaragua

Coordinates: 12.1268673°N 86.3035940°W

- Universidad Central de Nicaragua (UCN)
- Other names: UCN
- Motto: Pensando en tu futuro
- Motto in English: Thinking about your future
- Type: Private, non-profit
- Established: 1998
- Rector: Francisco López Pérez
- Location: Managua, Nicaragua
- Colors: Green, gold, & blue
- Website: www.ucn.edu.ni

The Central University of Nicaragua (Spanish: Universidad Central de Nicaragua, UCN) is a private university in Nicaragua.

Founded in 1998, UCN has been accredited and recognized by the Nicaraguan Ministry of Education, and has also been internationally accredited by the UK-based Accreditation Service for International Colleges and Universities (ASIC).

== Division of International and European Programs ==
On 22 March 2012, the UCN signed in Managua an agreement with the United Mahatma Gandhi University in India, Universidad de Cundinamarca in Colombia, Universidad de la Salle in Costa Rica, 3G University in the UAE, Fundación Universitaria Samuel Hahnemann in Colombia and Universidad Azteca in Mexico to issue degrees externally through the institutions. UCN also offers an EdD-PhD programme in Innsbruck, Austria.

UCN also collaborates with Texila American University, Guyana, to provide distance learning programs. In Nicaragua, it has 3 locations hosting 6,473 on-campus students and 4,251 distance learning students as of 2014.

== Faculties and programs ==
The university offers courses in medicine, pharmacy, business, law, social science, engineering, veterinary medicine, and psychology.
