= Churchill's Secret War =

2010 book by Madhusree Mukerjee

- Author: Madhusree Mukerjee
- Language: English
- Subject: Bengal famine of 1943
- Publisher: Basic Books, Tranquebar Press
- Publication date: 10 August 2010 (US)
- Publication place: United States
- Media type: Print (hardback & paperback), digital
- Pages: 332 (hardback)
- ISBN: 978-0465002016 (first US hardback edition)
- OCLC: 768097130

Churchill's Secret War: The British Empire and the Ravaging of India during World War II is a book by Madhusree Mukerjee about the Bengal famine of 1943 during the period of British rule in India. It was published in August 2010 by Basic Books of New York, and later that month by Tranquebar Press of Chennai. The book examines the role in the famine, and subsequent partition of India in 1947, of Prime Minister Winston Churchill. (Note: Churchill served two terms as prime minister: 1940–1945 and 1951–1955.)

Mukerjee claims that Churchill's policies exacerbated the famine, and argues that Churchill and his war cabinet ignored the suffering in Bengal, prioritizing the war effort over humanitarian needs. Her book provides evidence of Churchill's dismissive attitude towards the famine and his decision to continue exporting food from India during the crisis, and writes that the famine killed 1.5 million people according to the official estimate and three million according to most others. The book also explores how, apart from the United Kingdom itself, British India became "the largest contributor to the empire's war—providing goods and services worth more than £2 billion."

== Synopsis ==
The book sets out to document how colonial policies and negligence created the condition for a famine to break out in the Bengal region. Mukerjee argues that due to Churchill's racial and political worldview the colonial government (under his supreme control) would, in the words of Lord Wavell, feed only those Indians who were "actually fighting or making munitions or working some particular railways". The book examines how Frederick Lindemann, Lord Cherwell, close to Churchill, had a significant influence on him. (Note: Lindemann became a baron in 1941 and a viscount in 1956.) Known as "the Prof", Cherwell was an aging scientist with "Malthusian ideas" and held racist views towards Indians, whom he characterised as "helots".

The book examines the condition of India during the war. India produced 600,000 miles of cotton fabric for Allied interests during the war, Mukerjee writes. Because of the shortfall and inflation this caused within India, Mukerjee the poorest were reduced to covering themselves with scraps or going naked. Women would have to stay indoors all day waiting for others to return with the single piece of cloth the family possessed. In 1942, as a result of the Japanese conquest of Burma that began that year, the colonial government in India introduced a "denial policy" in Bengal, a scorched earth policy designed to deny Japan access to food and transport should it invade Bengal. Mukerjee attributes the "scorched earth" approach to Churchill, who reportedly urged it on 14 November 1941. The "rice denial" policy saw soldiers confiscate and destroy rice deemed surplus; according to one journalist, thousands of tons of rice were thrown into the water in east Bengal. The "boat denial" policy saw 46,000 boats able to carry more than ten passengers confiscated; bicycles, carts and elephants were also taken. One civil servant said the policy "completely broke the economy of the fishing class" in Bengal. Yet Churchill wrote after the war (a remark with which Mukerjee opens her prologue): "No great portion of the world population was so effectively protected from the horrors and perils of the World War as were the peoples of Hindustan [India]. They were carried through the struggle on the shoulders of our small island."

Mukerjee writes that

In the end, it was not so much racism as the imbalance of power inherent in the social Darwinian pyramid that explains why famine could be tolerated in India while bread rationing was regarded as an intolerable deprivation in wartime Britain. Cherwell, for instance, did not think much of the British working class either, but he was deeply engaged in feeding it and placating it. Economist Amartya Sen observes that famine has never occurred in a functioning democracy—a form of government that inverts the traditional power structure by making rulers accountable to those whom they rule.

Mukerjee writes that Lindemann convinced Churchill to send more than half of British merchant shipping from the Indian Ocean to the Atlantic Ocean. The Ministry of War Transport warned that such dramatic cuts to shipping capacity in South East Asia would "portend violent changes and perhaps cataclysms in the seaborne trade of large numbers of countries" but was ignored. The "menace of famine suddenly loomed up like a hydra-headed monster with a hundred clamouring mouths" according to C. B. A. Behrens in the official history of Allied merchant shipping. The book also documents Lindemann's poor decision-making elsewhere in the war.

== Reception ==
In Economic and Political Weekly, anthropologist Felix Padel wrote that the book "makes clear the real economy of the Raj: not just blocking Indian manufacturing in cloth, etc, reducing India to mainly supplying raw cotton for British manufacturers, but also a grain drain in which Indian agricultural exports had become vital for Britain's economy." The historian Chandak Sengoopta wrote in The Independent that Mukerjee had researched the famine with "forensic rigour": "Her calmly phrased but searing account of imperial brutality will shame admirers of the Greatest Briton and horrify just about everybody else."

Reviewing the book in The Sunday Times, Max Hastings wrote:

To put the matter brutally, millions of Indians were allowed to starve so that available shipping—including vessels normally based in India—could be used to further British purposes elsewhere. When Churchill's nation was engaged in a desperate struggle, perhaps this reflected strategic logic. But it made nonsense of his post-war claims about upholding the interests of the Indian people, and indeed of the whole paternalistic ethic by which the empire sought to justify itself.

Hastings disagrees with Mukerjee on two points: he doubts that, as she wrote, the British were responsible for the 1945 plane crash that killed Subhas Chandra Bose, the Indian nationalist leader, and he argues that Churchill cannot be blamed for the 1947 partition of India. But he concludes that "the broad thrust of Mukerjee's book is as sound as it is shocking". In his book Hungry Bengal: War, Famine, Riots and the End of Empire (2015), the historian Janam Mukherjee argued that Churchill's Secret War belongs to the "nationalist mode of Indian historiography", but that it "nevertheless provides moving insight into the colossal indifference, and at times sheer spite, that characterized London's attitude toward starving Bengal". Shashi Tharoor's review in Time concluded:

Churchill said that history would judge him kindly because he intended to write it himself. The self-serving but elegant volumes he authored on the war led the Nobel Committee, unable in all conscience to bestow him an award for peace, to give him, astonishingly, the Nobel Prize for Literature—an unwitting tribute to the fictional qualities inherent in Churchill's self-justifying embellishments. Mukerjee's book depicts a truth more awful than any fiction.

In December 2020, historian Zareer Masani gave the book a negative review in conservative magazine The Critic, describing it as "sensationalist" and a "largely conspiracist attempt to pin responsibility on distant Churchill for undoubted mistakes on the ground in Bengal".

== Publication details ==
- Churchill's Secret War: The British Empire and the Ravaging of India during World War II. New York: Basic Books. 10 August 2010. ISBN 978-0465002016.
- Churchill's Secret War: The British Empire and the Ravaging of India during World War II. Chennai: Tranquebar Press. 16 August 2010. ISBN 978-9380658476.
