= Madhusree Mukerjee =

American writer

- Born: 1961 (age 64–65); Calcutta, West Bengal, India
- Education: Jadavpur University; University of Chicago
- Occupations: Writer, editor
- Notable work: Churchill's Secret War (2010)
- Website: madhusree.com

Madhusree Mukerjee (born 1961) is an Indian-American science writer, editor, and journalist. She is the author of The Land of Naked People: Encounters with Stone Age Islanders (2003) and Churchill's Secret War: The British Empire and the Ravaging of India during World War II (2010). She is a contributor to the People's Archive of Rural India and a senior editor with Scientific American.

== Early life and education ==
Mukerjee was born in West Bengal, India. She is a graduate of Jadavpur University with a degree in physics. After obtaining a Ph.D. in physics from the University of Chicago—supervised by Yoichiro Nambu—she began post-doctoral studies at the California Institute of Technology (Caltech).

== Career ==
After completing her post-doctoral studies at Caltech, Mukerjee took up science journalism and worked for Physics Today for one year and since 2003, she has worked for Scientific American, where she is the senior editor for science and society.

She received a Guggenheim fellowship to complete her first book, entitled The Land of Naked People (2003). In her second book, entitled Churchill's Secret War (2010), Mukerjee documents the role played by the policies, as well as the racial and political worldview, of the war-time Prime Minister Winston Churchill and his trusted friend and advisor, Frederick Lindemann, in the death and devastation caused by the Bengal famine of 1943 and the partition of India.

== Personal life ==
During 2011, Mukerjee was living in Germany with her husband, who teaches physics at Frankfurt University, and their son.

== Selected works ==
- Mukerjee, Madhusree (2014). "A Prime Example of British Civilization (1943) from Biplabi". In Schiffrin, Anya (ed.). Global muckraking : 200 years of investigative journalism from around the. New Press. ISBN 978-1595589736.
- Mukerjee, Madhusree (2011). Churchill's secret war : the british empire and the ravaging of india during world war ii. New York: Basic Books. ISBN 978-0465024810.
- Mukerjee, Madhusree (2003). The land of naked people : encounters with Stone Age islanders. Boston: Houghton Mifflin. ISBN 0618197362.
