= Indian Empire Society =

Organisation promoting British imperialism in the Indian subcontinent

The Indian Empire Society was a London-based lobbying organization, formed in 1930 to promote the cause of the British Indian Empire.

The Society came into being at a meeting in July 1930 held in the Caxton Hall, London, at which the prime mover was Sir Michael O'Dwyer, a former Lieutenant Governor of the Punjab, following correspondence between the 4th Marquess of Salisbury and George Clarke, 1st Baron Sydenham of Combe. Its activists were mostly former members of the Indian Civil Service and included several former provincial governors of British India, among them O'Dwyer, Lord Meston, and Sir Reginald Craddock. Its principal goal was to resist the policy of Indian constitutional reform which successive British governments of the 1930s had begun to pursue.

Field Marshal Sir Claud Jacob, a former Commander-in-Chief, India, was chairman of the Society's Executive Committee.

The society's aims, and its membership, often overlapped with those of the India Defence League. The society frequently cited its deep concern for the fate of the Indian masses under a democratic system. A joint letter (written in 1933) sums up the society's attitude:

"As retired Government servants, with long experience of Indian conditions, we are convinced that a too rapid advance towards self-government would be fraught with the utmost danger, not only to British trade and commerce, but also to the security and happiness of the 350,000,000 of our Indian fellow-subjects." (published in the Times, 1933)

The society's first public meeting was held in Westminster in July 1930. The first president was Lord Sumner. Winston Churchill joined in October 1930 and made speeches to the society on a number of occasions. Other prominent members included:

- Lord Ampthill, former governor of Madras
- Sir Hugh Barnes, former governor of Burma
- Sir Reginald Craddock, former governor of Burma
- Sir Mark Hunter, former official in Burma
- Sir Michael O'Dwyer, former lieutenant governor of Punjab
- Sir Charles Oman, historian
- Sir Louis Stuart, former chief judge of Oudh
- Lord Sydenham, former governor of Bombay
- Waris Ameer Ali, former district judge in the United Provinces of Agra and Oudh

Correspondence and papers of the Society from 1930 to 1948 are held in the Bodleian Library's Special Collections and Western Manuscripts section.
