= Soku hi =

Soku-hi (Japanese: 即非) means "is and is not". The term is primarily used by the representatives of the Kyoto School of Eastern philosophy.

The logic of soku-hi or "is and is not" represents a balanced logic of symbolization reflecting sensitivity to the mutual determination of universality and particularity in nature, and a corresponding emphasis on nonattachment to linguistic predicates and subjects as representations of the real.

== See also ==
- Emptiness, a concept in Kyoto School philosophy
- Nishida Kitaro

== References and external links ==
- Logic of soku-hi by D.T. Suzuki (poetry)
- Rude awakenings: Zen, the Kyoto school, & the question of nationalism, by James W. Heisig & John C. Maraldo. p. 24.
- 'The Kyoto School' on the Stanford Encyclopedia of Philosophy
