= Universidad Azteca =

University in Mexico

Azteca University
- Universidad Azteca
- Type: Private, non-profit
- Established: 1984
- Chancellor: Miguel Agustín López Reyes
- Rector: José Agustín López González Pacheco
- Academic staff: 1,450 (2023)
- Students: 16,200 (2023)
- Location: Chalco, Mexico
- Campus: Chalco, Cancun, Zaragoza
- Colors: Black, Blue and White
- Website: Official Website

The Universidad Azteca (also known as Universidad Azteca de Chalco) is a private university in Chalco, Mexico in a community in Mexico State in the greater Mexico City area. Universidad Azteca is a private university with recognition of the Official Validity of Studies awarded by the Federal Secretary of Education (RVOE), accredited by the Federal Ministry of Education of the Republic, and recognized by the Federal Government to provide higher education and award graduate and postgraduate university degrees.

According to the Mexican Higher Education Laws, Universidad Azteca is authorized to offer study programs and award degrees with RVOE and autonomous programs and academic degrees of the university. The study areas with RVOE (accreditation) are Administration Informatics; Architecture; Business Administration; Education Sciences; International Commerce; Law; Pedagogics; Psychology; Public Accounting. The university awards undergraduate Bachelor, graduate Master, postgraduate Master and Doctoral degrees in international programs in accordance with the Bologna Process and issues a Diploma Supplement.

Universidad Azteca International Network System is the university extension, collaborating with other universities globally and branch campus facilities in Austria, Switzerland, United Arab Emirates, India, Bangladesh named BITHM College of Professionals.

== History ==
Universidad Azteca is affiliated with the Centro de Estudios Superiores Azteca. The private university was established in 1984 and recognized by the federal Secretary of Public Education (SEP) of the United States of Mexico in 1987. The Branch Campus of European Programs in Austria was duly approved and registered by the Austrian Federal Ministry of Science in 2012The university was internationally accredited by ASIC with "Premier University" status in 2013.

== Accreditations ==
The university is accredited by the Reconocimiento de Validez Oficial de Estudios (RVOE) and the Secretary of Public Education (SEP) to award graduate and postgraduate degrees. It is listed with the official Mexican government cultural and scientific information exchange network as an accredited university. Universidad Azteca de Chalco is also listed in International Association of Universities of United Nations Educational, Scientific and Cultural Organization (UNESCO).

Universidad Azteca is a PREMIER PROVIDER accredited university by Accreditation Service for International Colleges and Universities (ASIC) the t UK for the period 2013 - 2017. Universidad Azteca International Programmes offered via the Deanship of European Programmes in Austria are duly approved and registered by the Austrian Ministry of Science and Research in accordance with the Austrian Law on Quality Assurance in Higher Education.

== Academic programs ==
According to the Mexican constitution and higher education laws, Universidad Azteca de Chalco is authorized to award degrees with RVOE for nationals and own academic and professional higher degrees of the university (grados propios). The university offers traditional (on-campus) study, and virtual e-learning (in real time) and awards degrees in various specializations study areas. The study areas are included:

University Labouratory

- Business Administration
- Architecture, Architectural engineering
- Science education and Pedagogy
- International Commerce
- Public Accounting and Accounting (including financial management) and Educational Science
- Law (generalspecializationsns in fiscal and penal codes)
- Information Systems and Data Processing (IT)
- Psychology (including neurolinguistic psychotherapy and coaching)
- Hotel Management

== Campus in Mexico ==
Main Campus in Chalco

Campus in San Vicente

There are eighcampusesus located in Mexico:

- Campus Chalco (Main Campus)
- Campus Cancún
- Campus Zaragoza
- Campus Los Reyes
- Campus San Juan del Rio
- Campus Valle de Chalco
- Campus Ciudad Acuña
- Campus Tecamac

== European and international programs ==
Deanship of European Programs in Innsbruck, Austria

Universidad Azteca – European Programs is an approved member of the European Council for Business Education (ECBE). ECBE is an Affiliate of the European Association of Quality Assurance for Higher Education (ENQA), which recognizes ECBE as a bona fide quality assurance agency and a network of higher education institutions and agencies. The Dean of European and International Programs is based in Austria, where all programs provided in Austria are duly approved and registered by the Austrian Federal Ministry of Science and Research as comparable to Austrian university programs and degrees complying with the requirements of the Austrian Act on Quality Assurance in Higher Education. Universidad Aztec University's programs provided in Austria meet the quality standards of DIQMA and were accredited by DIQMA in 2017. DIQMA is a Deutsch education quality assessment institute. Universidad Azteca Programs provided in Austria are also accredited by TRACCERT Training Accreditation & Certification Organization Canada. TRACCERT is a registered accrediting agency of Canada. Universidad Azteca offers a range of university own degree programs to European and International students as stand-alone or as inter-university dual degree programs included validation degrees, taught online degrees, research master's degrees, and research doctorates programs.

== Promotion of youth education ==
Universidad Azteca supports the development of youth education. Doctor Jesus Rendon Garcia, Principal of ITUEHigh Schoolol and Dean of Universidad Azteca Toluca, met with IYF during the 2010 Mexico World Camp. After the camp, Dr. Garcia invited the IYF to the school and prepared many programs such as mind lectures and bible studies. Soon after, ITUEM school was running the top of the educational assessment, which is a drastic change because they were one of the lowest. Dr. Garcia was amazed at the excellence of IYF's mind education programs and suggested presenting an honorary PhD to the Universidad Azteca. The proposal was passed unanimously by the board. Pastor Lee Hun Mok and Kim Ki Sung received an honorary degree in psychology and a PhD, respectively. Pastor Kim Jae Hong received an honorary PhD from Ulaanbaatar Erdem University. Pastor Park Ock Soo received an honorary PhD from Universidad Azteca Mexico, for his contribution to mind education for youth. (Aug. 21st, 2016)

== See also ==
- Scientific criticism of neuro-linguistic programming
