= Sunil Janah =

Indian-American photojournalist and documentary photographer

- Born: Sunil Janah; 17 April 1918; Assam, India
- Died: 21 June 2012 (aged 94); Berkeley, California, USA
- Education: St. Xavier's College, Kolkata
- Known for: 1943 Bengal famine coverage

Sunil Janah (17 April 1918 — 21 June 2012) was an Indian-American photojournalist and documentary photographer who worked in India in the 1940s. Janah documented India's independence movement, its peasant and labour movements, famines and riots, rural and tribal life, as well as the years of rapid urbanization and industrialization. He was best known for his coverage of the Bengal famine of 1943.

The Government of India awarded him the civilian honour of Padma Bhushan in 2012.

== Early life and education ==
Sunil Janah was born on 17 April 1918 in a Bengali Mahishya family to Sarat Chandra Jana, a prominent advocate at the Calcutta High Court, at Dibrugarh, Assam but grew up in Kolkata. His ancestral house was in Birulia village of Nandigram, Purba Medinipur. He attended St. Xavier's College, Kolkata at the University of Calcutta. There, he joined politically leftist students.

== Life and work ==
Communist politician Puran Chand Joshi urged Janah to abandon his English studies and pursue a career in photography. Janah traveled to Bengal with Chittaprosad Bhattacharya to photograph the damage caused by the 1943 Bengal famine. He moved with Bhattacharya to Bombay and joined the Progressive Writers Association and Indian People's Theatre Association.

He was also a co-founder of Calcutta Film Society. He was awarded the Padma Shri in 1972 and the Padma Bhushan in 2012.

Noted for the beauty and technical quality of his compositions, Janah's photographs are significant in their historical content as well as their emotional connect.

He was best known for his coverage of the Bengal famine of 1943.

=== Photographer of the Nehruvian Era ===
In People's War and after that People's Age Janah used to have one page for a photo feature for which he photographed the lives of ordinary people, their struggles, the working class at work, rowing boats, catching fish, in coal mines, from men and women working in homes and fields to bow and arrow carrying tribal people, farmers and workers heading to protest, revolutionaries of Telangana and via these photographs he established the Communist Party's ideology and commitment amongst the people.

Janah made portraits of Gandhi, Nehru, Jinnah, Sheikh Abdullah, Faiz, and J Krishnamurthi.

Photographer and curator Ram Rahman said, "Janah's work is the defining epic document of the last decade of the freedom struggle and the first decade of free India — a chronicler of the 'Nehruvian' years".

=== Death ===
He died on 21 June 2012 at his home in Berkeley, California due to natural causes.

== Personal life ==
His son, Arjun, lives in Brooklyn, New York.

== Publications ==
- Shadowing a Philanthropologist, By Ramachandra Guha, University of Chicago Press, 398 pp, ISBN 978-0-226-31047-3
