= Famine Inquiry Commission =

Official investigation of 1943 Bengal famine

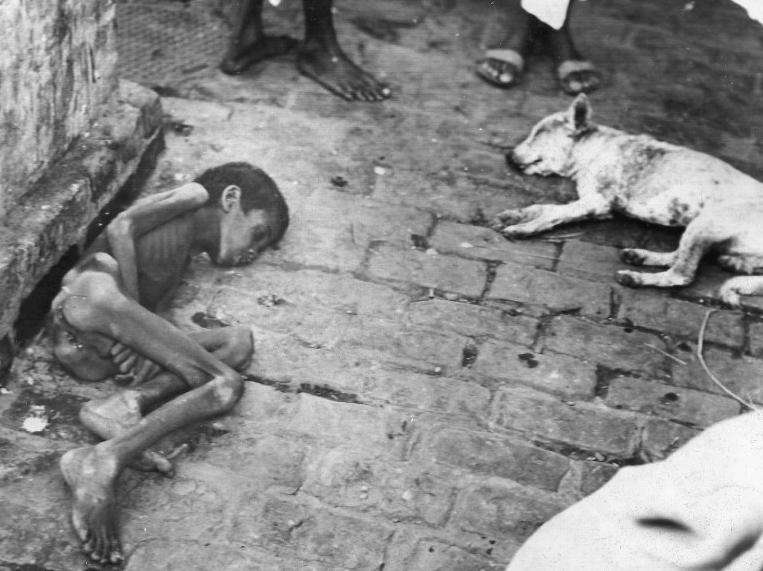
Bengal famine victim, 1943

The Famine Inquiry Commission, also known as the Woodhead Commission, was appointed by the Government of British India in 1944 to investigate the 1943 Bengal famine. Controversially, it declined to blame the British government and emphasised the natural, rather than man-made, causes of the famine.

After Archibald Wavell arrived as Viceroy of India in October 1943, he encountered sustained demands from Indian politicians for an inquiry into the ongoing famine. He stated that British inaction caused incalculable damage to the British empire's reputation. Leopold Amery, secretary of state for India, worried that an inquiry would be "disastrous". If an inquiry had to be held, it should focus not on Indian financing of the war effort—which he believed was responsible for the famine—but instead on the food supply and population growth to the exclusion of political considerations. The commission was finally appointed in 1944, chaired by Sir John Woodhead, a former civil servant and friend of Amery's who had previously led the Palestine Partition Commission. Other members included a representative each from the Hindu and Muslim communities, a nutrition expert, and Sir Manilal Nanavati, the former deputy governor of the Reserve Bank of India. The hearings were acrimonious and held in camera. Reportedly, the commission's members were ordered to destroy the transcripts of the proceedings following the publication of their report, but Nanavati declined to do so.

The commission published its report in May 1945, absolving the British government of most of the blame for the deaths during the famine. According to the inquiry, shortage in the rice harvest was one of the main causes of the famine. It also found that the shortage only amounted to three weeks and that shortage had been more serious in 1941, a year in which there had been no famine. The report acknowledged some failures in British price controls and transportation efforts but reserved its most forceful finger-pointing for local politicians in the (largely Muslim) provincial Government of Bengal: As it stated, "...after considering all the circumstances, we cannot avoid the conclusion that it lay in the power of the Government of Bengal, by bold, resolute and well-conceived measures at the right time to have largely prevented the tragedy of the famine". The Famine Inquiry Commission's position with respect to charges that prioritised distribution aggravated the famine is that the Government of Bengal's lack of control over supplies was the more serious matter. American writer Madhusree Mukerjee questions the accuracy of some of the inquiry's figures, claiming that the final report altered the figures from some sources. The estimate of the number of deaths, at 1.5 million, is much lower than the commonly accepted estimates today.

At the time, Indian nationalists – though notedly not Gandhi – were infuriated with the report and blamed Britain for the famine. According to developmental economics professor Siddiqur R. Osmani and Amrita Rangasami, the report was "designed to exonerate the administration from any blame for the famines" by focusing on a FAD (food availability decline) explanation. Mukerjee writes that Bengali administrators exhibited a sophisticated understanding of famine, specifically the role of taxation and speculation in causing them, but the Famine Inquiry Commission ignored this aspect. In her opinion, the "Famine Commission’s best efforts were directed not towards explaining the famine, but towards obscuring the role played by His Majesty’s government in precipitating and aggravating" it. Cormac Ó Gráda refers to "the muted, kid-glove tone" of the report, stating that wartime circumstances led the commissioners to omit criticism of the British government for allegedly failing to send additional supplies. According to Benjamin Siegel, the commission reached correct and nuanced conclusions, but "the political imperatives of the day won out" in the final report. Economist Peter Bowbrick defends the report's accuracy, which he considers "excellent... [i]n spite of the deficiencies of their market analysis" and much superior to that of Amartya Sen's writing.
