= Sanjoy Bhattacharya =

Indian medical historian

Sanjoy Bhattacharya FRAS

Academic background
- Education: St. Stephen's College, Delhi; Jawaharlal Nehru University; School of Oriental and African Studies

Academic work
- Institutions: Sheffield Hallam University; University of Oxford; University College London; University of York; University of Leeds

Sanjoy Bhattacharya, FRAS, is a British-Indian academic and historian, who is the permanent Head of the School of History at the University of Leeds in the United Kingdom of Great Britain and Northern Ireland, where he is also the professor of medical and global health histories.

== Career ==
Sanjoy Bhattacharya completed his undergraduate studies at St. Stephen's College, Delhi, before earning a Master of Arts degree from Jawaharlal Nehru University, and then a doctorate from the School of Oriental and African Studies in London. He was appointed a Wellcome Trust research fellow at Sheffield Hallam University in 1997, and took up a research fellowship at the University of Oxford four years later; at the same time, he was appointed to a lectureship at University College London, and remained there until 2010, when he became Reader in the History of Medicine at the University of York, where has since been promoted to a professorship and appointed Director of the Centre for Global Health Histories and Director of the World Health Organization Collaborating Centre for Global Health Histories. Bhattacharya moved to the University of Leeds, UK, on 1 September 2022, to take over as the permanent Head of the School of History.

He edited the journal Medical History for 10 years between 2012 and 2022, continues as editor of Cambridge University Press's Global Health Histories series, and a co-editor of Orient Blackswan's New Perspectives in South Asian History series. In 2011, Bhattacharya was elected a Fellow of the Royal Asiatic Society of Great Britain and Ireland, where he now serves as a member of its Governing Council.

Bhattacharya's research focuses on the medical, environmental and social history of South Asia in the 19th and 20th centuries and the modern history of global health programmes. In 2021, during the global COVID-19 pandemic, Bhattacharya pointed out that vaccine passports were first introduced over a century earlier, in British India in 1897, to control the spread of plague and smallpox.
