= Theories of famines =

Theories regarding the causes of famine

The conventional explanation until 1951 for the cause of famines was the decline of food availability relative to the nutritional needs of the population (abbreviated as FAD for food availability decline). The assumption was that the central cause of all famines was a decline in food availability by reason of decline in food production or disruption of food distribution. However this does not explain why only a certain section of the population such as the agricultural laborer was affected by famines while others were insulated from them. On the other hand, inequalities in wealth or ability to exit food shortage areas sufficiently explain such phenomena.

== Failure of exchange entitlements ==
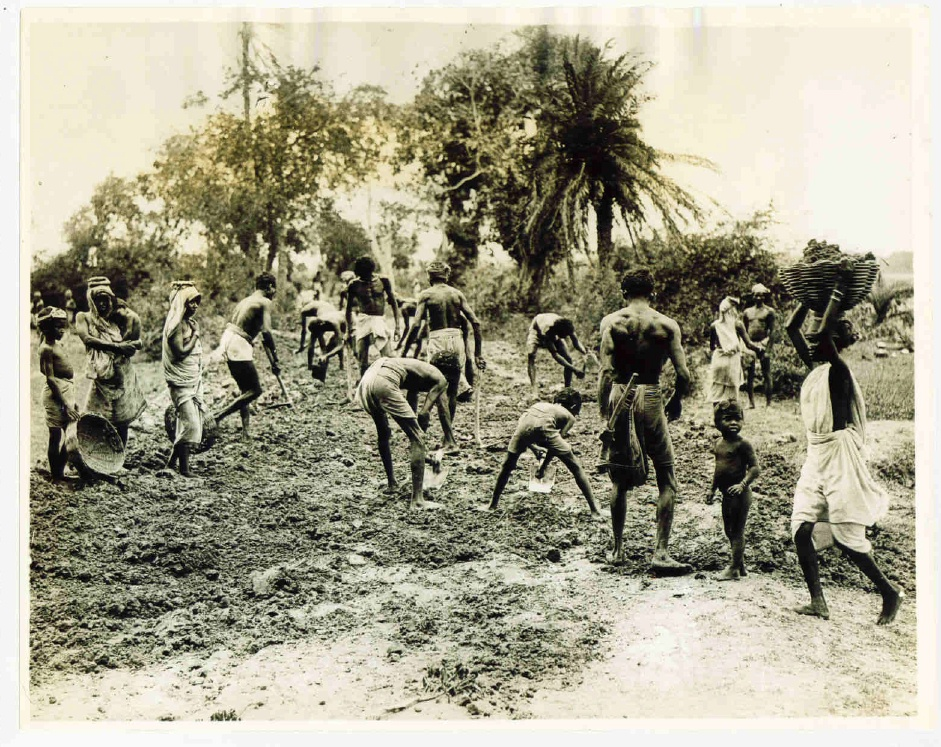
Citizens in Bengal road making as part of a famine relief project.

It has been suggested by Amartya Sen in his book Poverty and Famines: An Essay on Entitlement and Deprivation that the causal mechanism for precipitating starvation includes many variables other than just the decline of food availability such as the inability of an agricultural laborer to exchange his primary entitlement, i.e. labor for rice, when his employment became erratic or was completely eliminated. According to the proposed theory, famines are due to an inability of a person to exchange his entitlements rather than to food unavailability. This theory is called the failure of exchange entitlements or FEE in short.

Amartya Sen also touches on this in an article titled The Food Problem: Theory and Policy from Third World Quarterly, "The approach of entitlements also provides guidance regarding relief of famines should it occur or threaten to occur. Moving food into famine areas will not in itself do much to cure starvation, since what needs to be created is food entitlement and not just food availability."

== Lack of democracy ==
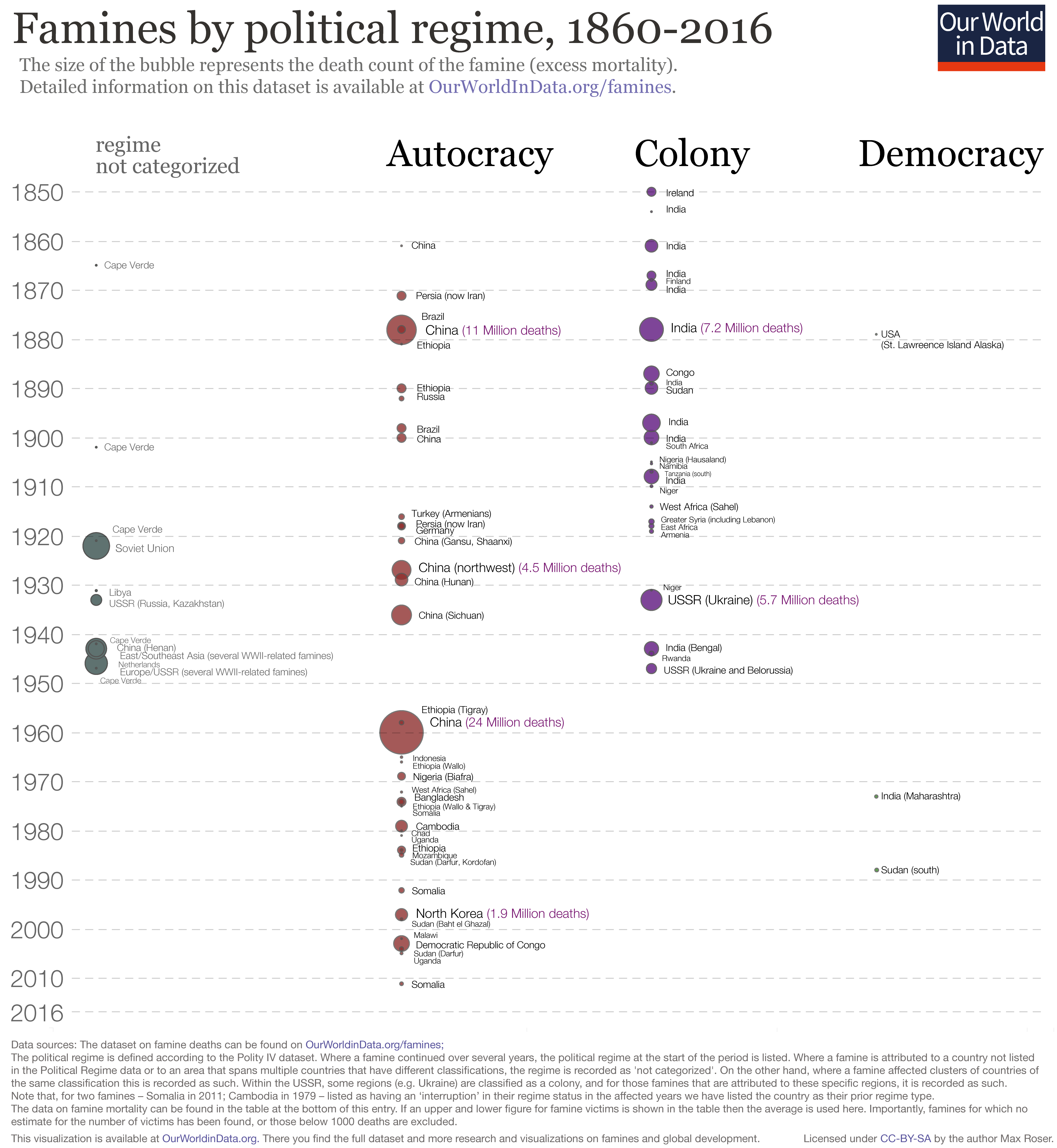
Famines since 1850 by political regime. Autocratic states have experienced significantly more famines than democratic states.

Amartya Sen advances the theory that lack of democracy and famines are interrelated; he cites the example of the Bengal famine of 1943, stating that it only occurred because of the lack of democracy in India under British rule. Sen further argues that the situation was aggravated by the British government's suspension of trade in rice and grains among various Indian provinces.

Olivier Rubin's review of the evidence disagrees with Sen; after examining the cases of post-Independence India, Niger, and Malawi, he finds that "democracy is no panacea against famine." Rubin's analysis questions whether democracy and a free press were sufficient to truly avert famine in 1967 and 1972 (the Maharashtra famine involved some 130,000 deaths), and notes that some dynamics of electoral democracy complicate rather than bring about famine relief efforts. Rubin does not address colonial period famines.

On the other hand, Andrew Banik's study Starvation and India's democracy affirms Sen's thesis, but indicates that while democracy has been able to prevent famines in India, it has not been sufficient to avoid severe under-nutrition and starvation deaths, which Banik calls a 'silent emergency' in the country.

According to a FEWSNET report, "Famines are not natural phenomena, they are catastrophic political failures."

== See also ==
- Food security
- Great Famine (Ireland)
- Welfare economics
- Agricultural economics
- Nutritional anthropology
- r/K selection theory
- Starvation (crime)
- Malthusianism
