= Chittaprosad Bhattacharya =

Indian leftist political artist and writer

- Born: Chittaprosad Bhattacharya; 21 June 1915; Naihati, Calcutta, British India
- Died: 13 November 1978 (aged 63); Kolkata, India

Chittaprosad Bhattacharya (21 June 1915 – 13 November 1978) was an Indian political artist of the mid-20th century. He preferred watercolor and printmaking, avoiding oil on canvas.

== Early life ==
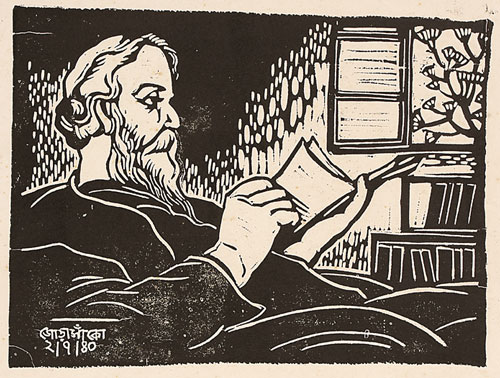
Rabindranath Tagore, Linocut on paper, 8.5 x 11.5 in., DAG Museums

Born in 1915 in Naihati , present-day North 24 Parganas District, West Bengal, Chittaprosad became radicalized as a student of the Chittagong Government College in the mid-1930s. He joined the grassroots movement to resist both colonial oppression by the British, and also the feudal oppression of the landed Indian gentry. Chittaprosad rejected the classicism of the Bengal School and its spiritual preoccupations. Due to his refusal to accept the discriminations of the caste system, Chittaprosad never used his Brahminical surname during his life. He wrote articles and produced incisive cartoons and illustrations that displayed a natural talent for draughtsmanship.

== Career and style ==
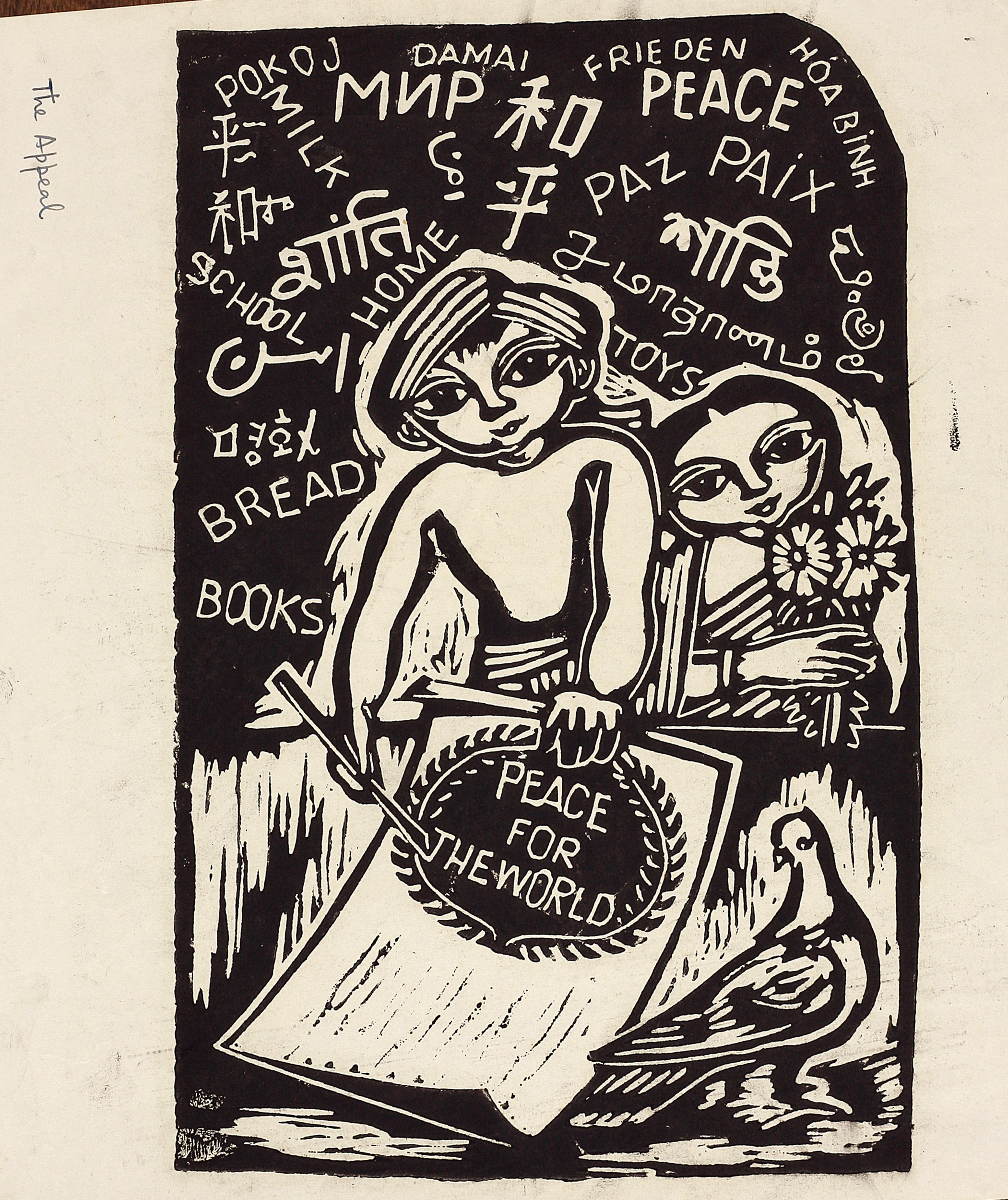
The Appeal, Linocut print, 11.0 x 7.0 in., DAG Museums

Chittraprosad’s most creative years began in the 1930s. He satirized and sharply criticized the feudal and colonial systems in quickly drawn but masterful pen and ink sketches. As an artist, and reformer, Chittaprosad was also proficient at creating linocuts and woodcuts with obvious propagandistic intent. Since these cheaply made prints were created for the masses, rather than the art gallery, they were seldom signed or numbered. With time, they took on commercial value as art, and today are prized by collectors.

During World War II in 1943, Chittaprosad covered the Bengal Famine and used his art to expose it in various leftist nationalist media in the form of art, illustrating humans suffering from hunger that he had witnessed while traveling around that part of India. This resulted in his first publication, Hungry Bengal. It was a sharply provocative attack on the political and social powers of the time. The British authorities suppressed it nearly immediately, impounding and destroying large copies of Hungry Bengal.

Chittaprosad settled more permanently in Bombay from 1946 onward. The transformations that the Communist Party took between 1948 and 1949, caused the artist to disassociate himself from communism, though he continued to pursue political themes in his art to the end of his life. In the years before his death, Chittaprosad devoted more and more time to the world peace movement, and various efforts to help impoverished children.

He is represented in the National Museum in Prague, The National Gallery of Modern Art in New Delhi, Osians Art Archive in Mumbai, and the Jane and Kito de Boer Collection in Dubai.
