= Courts of England and Wales =

Civil and criminal courts

The Courts of England and Wales, supported administratively by His Majesty's Courts and Tribunals Service, are the civil and criminal courts responsible for the administration of justice in England and Wales.

Except in constitutional matters, committed to the Supreme Court of the United Kingdom, the United Kingdom does not generally have a single unified legal system—England and Wales have one system, Scotland another, and Northern Ireland a third. There are additional exceptions to this rule; for example, in immigration law, the Asylum and Immigration Tribunal's jurisdiction covers the whole of the United Kingdom, while in employment law, there is a single system of employment tribunals for England, Wales, and Scotland but not Northern Ireland. Additionally, the Military Court Service has jurisdiction over all members of the armed forces of the United Kingdom in relation to offences against military law.

The Court of Appeal, the High Court, the Crown Court, the County Court, and the magistrates' courts are administered by His Majesty's Courts and Tribunals Service, an executive agency of the Ministry of Justice.

There have been multiple calls from both Welsh academics and politicians for a Wales criminal justice system.

== Supreme Court of the United Kingdom ==
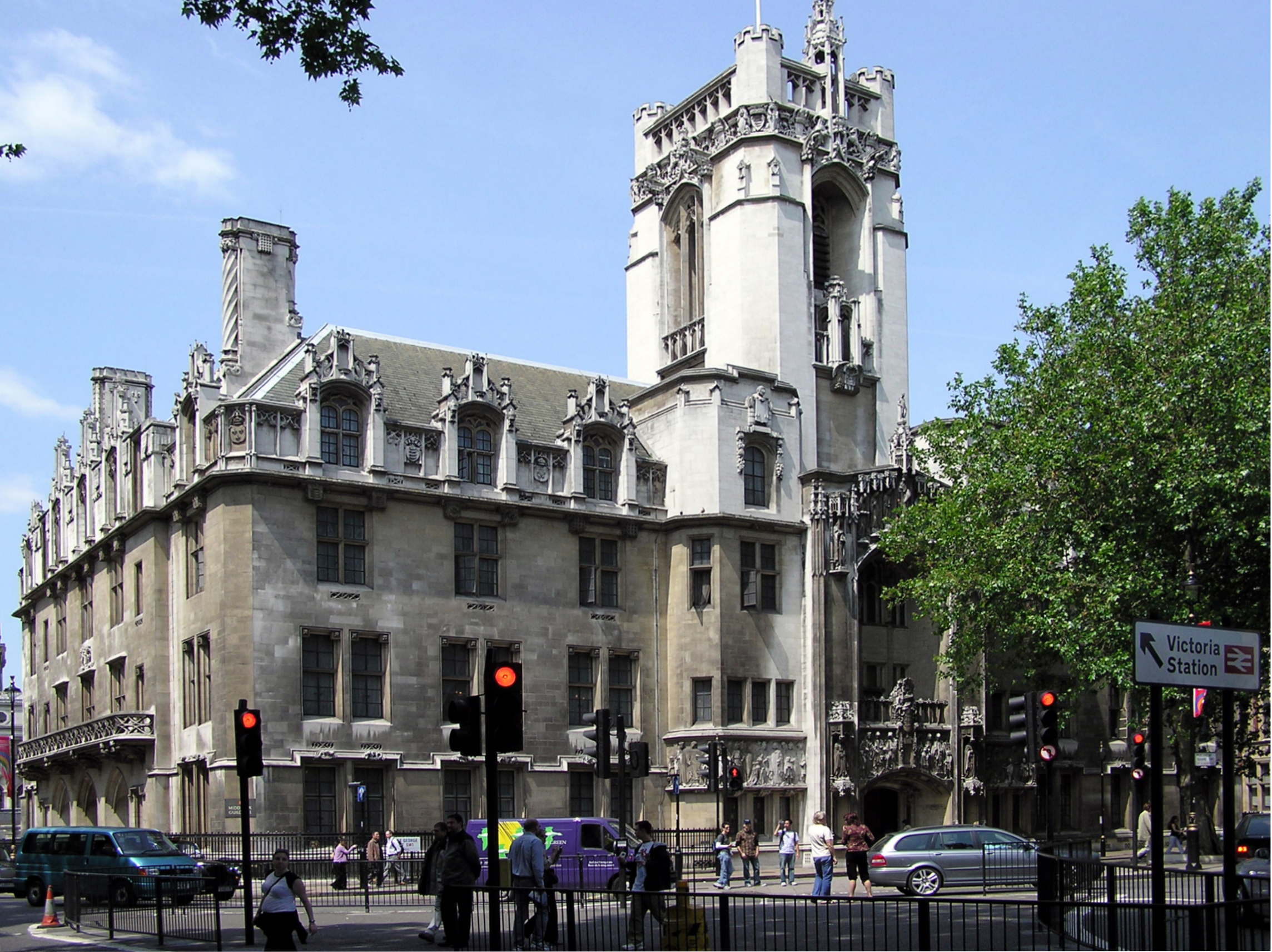
The Middlesex Guildhall houses the Supreme Court of the United Kingdom and Judicial Committee of the Privy Council.

The Supreme Court of the United Kingdom is the highest appeal court in almost all cases in England and Wales. Before the Constitutional Reform Act 2005 this role was held by the Appellate Committee of the House of Lords. The Supreme Court is also the highest court of appeal for devolution matters, a role previously held by the Judicial Committee of the Privy Council.

The Supreme Court has a separate administration from the other courts of England and Wales, and its administration is under a Chief Executive who is appointed by the President of the Supreme Court of the United Kingdom.

== Senior Courts of England and Wales ==
The Senior Courts of England and Wales were originally created by the Judicature Acts as the "Supreme Court of Judicature". It was renamed the "Supreme Court of England and Wales" in 1981, and again to the "Senior Courts of England and Wales" by the Constitutional Reform Act 2005 (to distinguish it from the new Supreme Court of the United Kingdom). It consists of the following courts:

- Court of Appeal (formally His Majesty's Court of Appeal in England)
- High Court of Justice (High Court, formally His Majesty's High Court of Justice in England)
- Crown Court

The Senior Courts of England and Wales, along with the Tribunals and other courts, are administered and supported by HM Courts and Tribunals Service.

=== Court of Appeal ===
Schematic of court system for England and Wales

The Court of Appeal deals only with appeals from other courts or tribunals. The Court of Appeal consists of two divisions: the Civil Division hears appeals from the High Court and the County Court and certain superior tribunals, while the Criminal Division may only hear appeals from the Crown Court connected with a trial on indictment (i.e., for a serious offence). Its decisions are binding on all courts, including itself, apart from the Supreme Court.

=== High Court ===
The High Court of Justice functions both as a civil court of first instance and a criminal and civil appellate court for cases from the subordinate courts. It consists of three divisions: the King's Bench; the Business and Property; and the Family divisions. The divisions of the High Court are not separate courts but have somewhat separate procedures and practices adapted to their purposes. Although particular kinds of cases will be assigned to each division depending on their subject matter, each division may exercise the jurisdiction of the High Court. This also means English High Court puisne judges and above can sit 'cross-bench' meaning they can hear matters normally assigned to another division should they so desire. However, beginning proceedings in the wrong division may result in a cost penalty.

The formation of the Business and Property Courts of England & Wales within the High Court was announced in March 2017, and launched in London in July 2017. The courts are based in the Rolls Building, where there are 31 courts and three super courts able to handle the most complex and multi-party trials. There are regional High Court centres at the civil and family courts in the major cities. The Business and Property Courts administer the specialist jurisdictions that had previously been administered in the Queen's Bench Division under the names of the Admiralty Court, the Commercial Court, and the Technology & Construction Court, and under the Chancery Division's lists for Business, Insolvency and Companies, Competition, Intellectual Property, Revenue, and Property, Trusts and Probate. In 2015, the Financial List was created "for financial claims of £50 million or more, or cases that raise issues concerning the domestic and international financial markets: the equity, derivatives, FX and commodities markets." There are also Regional Business and Property Courts.

The judicial expertise available in the Rolls Building includes asset recovery, banking, commodities, company law, construction, finance, fraud, insolvency and reconstruction. It also covers information technology, insurance, intellectual property (including patents), international trade, mining, oil and gas, partnership, property, public procurement, regulation, shipping, tax and trusts. All matters in this list are heard by judges with particular experience in determining disputes in their particular speciality.

=== Crown Court ===
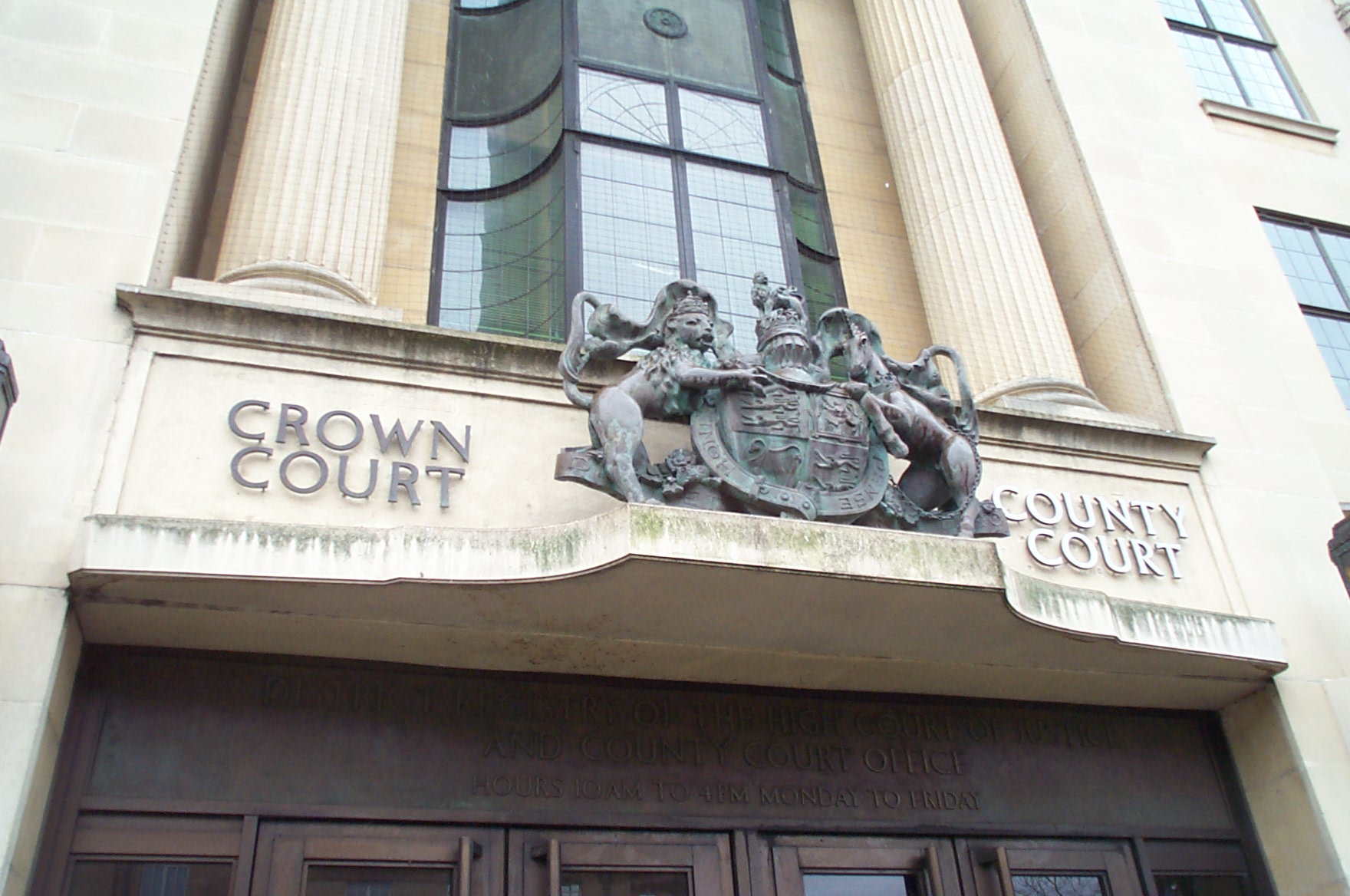
Crown Court and County Court in Oxford

The Crown Court is a criminal court of both original and appellate jurisdiction which in addition handles a limited amount of civil business both at first instance and on appeal. It was established by the Courts Act 1971. It replaced the assizes whereby High Court judges would periodically travel around the country hearing cases, and quarter sessions which were courts held periodically in counties, county boroughs and certain boroughs. The Old Bailey is the unofficial name of London's most famous criminal court, which is now part of the Crown Court. Its official name is the Central Criminal Court. The Crown Court also hears appeals from magistrates' courts.

The Crown Court is the only court in England and Wales that has the jurisdiction to try cases on indictment, and when exercising such a role, it is a superior court in that its judgments cannot be reviewed by the Administrative Court of the King's Bench Division of the High Court.

The Crown Court is an inferior court in respect of the other work it undertakes, namely among other things, appeals from the magistrates' courts and other tribunals.

== Subordinate courts ==
The most common subordinate courts in England and Wales are

- County Court
- Family Court
- Magistrates' courts
- Youth courts

=== County Court ===
The County Court is a national court with a purely civil jurisdiction, sitting in 92 different towns and cities across England and Wales. As of 22 April 2014 there has been a single County Court for England and Wales where previously there was a series of courts. The County Court is so named after the ancient sheriff's court held in each county, but it has no connection with it nor indeed was the jurisdiction of the county courts based on counties.

A County Court hearing is presided over by either a district or circuit judge and, except in a small minority of cases such as civil actions against the police, the judge sits alone as a trier of fact and law without assistance from a jury. The old county courts' divorce and family jurisdiction was passed on 22 April 2014 to the single Family Court.

Until unification in 2014, county courts were local courts in the sense that each one has an area over which certain kinds of jurisdiction, for example, proceedings for possession of the land had to be started in the county court in whose district the property lay, but in general, any county court in England and Wales could hear any action and claims were frequently transferred from court to court.

=== Family Court ===
The Family Court is a national court and has jurisdiction to hear all family cases in England and Wales. Local jurisdictional boundaries have disappeared and there is only one single jurisdiction for all family proceedings. The Family Court sits at many locations in England and Wales, and it usually sits at the County Court centres and magistrates courts where family work was previously heard by county courts or family proceedings courts. Family Court judges are now more categories of judges who will be eligible to hear family cases including lay magistrates, district judges, circuit judges, and High Court judges from the Family Division.

=== Magistrates' and youth courts ===
Magistrates' courts are local criminal courts, where all criminal proceedings start. They are presided over by a bench of magistrates (A.K.A. justices of the peace), or a legally trained district judge (formerly known as a stipendiary magistrate), sitting in each local justice area. There are no juries. They have jurisdiction to hear minor criminal cases, as well as certain licensing appeals. Youth courts are run on similar lines to adult magistrates' courts but deal with offenders aged between the ages of ten and seventeen inclusive. Youth courts are presided over by a specially trained subset of experienced adult magistrates or a district judge. Youth magistrates have a wider catalog of disposals available to them for dealing with young offenders and often hear more serious cases against youths (which for adults would normally be dealt with by the Crown Court). Youth courts are not open to the public for observation, only the parties involved in a case being admitted.

Prior to the enactment of the Crime and Courts Act 2013, some magistrates' courts were also a family proceedings court and heard family law cases including care cases and they had the power to make adoption orders. Family cases are no longer heard by the magistrates' courts, instead being heard by the single Family Court established by the 2013 Act.

== Special courts and tribunals ==
In addition, there are many other specialist courts. These are often described as "tribunals" rather than courts, but the difference in name is meaningless. For example, an employment tribunal is an inferior court of record for the purposes of the law of contempt of court. In many cases, there is a statutory right of appeal from a tribunal to a particular court or specially constituted appellate tribunal. In the absence of a specific appeals court, the only remedy from a decision of a tribunal may be via judicial review to the High Court, which will often be more limited in scope than an appeal.

Examples of specialist courts are:

- Employment tribunals (formerly industrial tribunals) with an appeal to the Employment Appeal Tribunal
- the Employment Appeal Tribunal, which is a superior court of record, and therefore not subject to judicial review, appeals go to the Court of Appeal
- the First-tier Tribunal and the Upper Tribunal established under the Tribunals, Courts and Enforcement Act 2007 have absorbed the function of many pre-existing tribunals.

=== Coroners' courts ===
The post of coroner is ancient, dating from the 11th century, and coroners still sit today to determine the cause of death in situations where people have died in potentially suspicious circumstances, abroad, or in the care of central authority. They also have jurisdiction over treasure trove.

=== Ecclesiastical courts ===
The Church of England is an established church (i.e. it is the official state church) and formerly had exclusive or non-exclusive subject matter jurisdiction over marriage and divorce cases, testamentary matters, defamation, and several other areas. Since the 19th century, the jurisdiction of the ecclesiastical courts has narrowed principally to matters of church property and errant clergy. Each diocese has a "chancellor" (either a barrister or solicitor) who acts as a judge in the consistory court of the diocese. The bishop no longer has the right to preside personally, as he formerly did. Appeals lie to the Arches Court (in Canterbury) and the Chancery Court (in York), and from them to the Court of Ecclesiastical Causes Reserved (CECR). From the CECR appeals lie to the Judicial Committee of the Privy Council.

=== Military courts ===
Military courts of the United Kingdom include

- the Summary Appeal Court
- the Service Civilian Court
- the Court Martial
- the Court Martial Appeal Court

=== Other courts ===
- Election court (ad-hoc courts hearing petitions against election results)
- The High Court of Chivalry (ancient and rarely convened court dealing with heraldry)
- Court of Claims (dealing with validity of the claims of persons to perform certain honorary services at the coronation. Not convened for the 2023 coronation and may now be abolished.)
- Verderers' courts (dealing with commoners' rights and related matters in the formerly royal hunting forests of the New Forest, the Forest of Dean and Epping Forest)
- Barmote court (largely ceremonial court dealing with lead mining rights in Derbyshire)
- Lordship of Denbigh Estray Court jurisdiction relates to return of lost sheep on common land

=== Court Leets ===
- The Administration of Justice Act 1977 abolished many courts, but made exception for 32 Court Leets. Their powers are significantly diminished from the era in which they held most power – the Court Leet of Henley in Arden, for example, is limited to the making of presentments about matters of local concern. There is also the Court Leet of Laxton, which continues to oversee the open field system in Laxton. These surviving Court Leets are:
  - The Alcester (Warwickshire) Court Leet, Court Baron and View of Frankpledge
  - The Ashburton Courts Leet and Baron
  - The Bideford Manor Court
  - The Court Leet and Court Baron of the Ancient Manor of Bowes in the County of Durham
  - The Ancient Court Leet and Court Baron of the Manor of Bromsgrove
  - The Bucklebury Court Baron
  - The Courts Leet and Baron of the Barony of Cemaes in the County of Dyfed
  - The Clifton Courts Leet and Baron and View of Frankpledge
  - The Manorial Court for the Hundred and Borough of Cricklade
  - The Croyland View of Frankpledge, Court Leet and Great Court Baron
  - The Danby Court Leet and Court Baron
  - The Manor of Dorney with Boveney Court Leet with Court Baron and View of Frankpledge
  - The Manor Court of Dunstone (otherwise Blackslade)
  - The Court Baron of East Horndon
  - The Courts Leet and Baron of the Manors of Eton-cum-Stockdales in Colenorton
  - The Manor of Fyling Court Leet
  - The Court Baron for the Manor of Heaton in the City of Bradford
  - The Court Leet and Court Baron of the Manor of Henley-in-Arden in the County of Warwick
  - The Town and Manor of Hungerford and Manor and Liberty of Sanden Fee Hocktide Court and Court Leet
  - The City of London Court of Husting.
  - The Manor of Mickley Court Leet and Court Baron.
  - The Court Leet and Baron of the Manor of Mynachlogddu in the County of Dyfed.
  - The Norwich Court of Mayoralty
  - The Court Leet of the Island and Royal Manor of Portland.
  - The Southampton Court Leet.
  - The Southwark Courts Leet and Views of Frankpledge for (respectively) the King's Manor of Southwark, the Guildable Manor and the Great Liberty Manor.
  - The Manor of Spaunton Court Leet and Court Baron with View of Frankpledge.
  - The Spitchwick Courts Leet and Baron.
  - The Courts Leet and Baron of Stockbridge.
  - The Court Leet of the Manor and Borough of Wareham
  - The Warwick Court Leet.
  - The Manor of Whitby Laithes Court Leet.
  - The Court leet of Laxton (deals with the open-field system of farming in Laxton)

== Criminal cases ==
There are two kinds of criminal trials: "summary" and "on indictment". For an adult, summary trials take place in a magistrates' court, while trials on indictment take place in the Crown Court. Despite the possibility of two venues for trial, almost all criminal cases, however serious, commence in a magistrates' courts. It is possible to start a trial for an indictable offence by a voluntary bill of indictment, and go directly to the Crown Court, but that would be unusual.

A criminal case that starts in the magistrates' courts may begin either by the defendant being charged (following arrest for a crime) and then being brought forcibly before magistrates, or by a summons to the defendant to appear on a certain day before the magistrates. A summons is usually confined to minor offences such as minor public order matters or common assault. The hearing (of the charge or summons) before the magistrates is known as a "first appearance".

Offences are of three categories: indictable only, summary, and either way. Indictable only offences such as murder and rape must be tried on indictment in the Crown Court. On first appearance, the magistrates must immediately refer the defendant to the Crown Court for trial, their only role being to decide whether to remand the defendant on bail or in custody.

Summary offences, such as most motoring offences, are much less serious and most must be tried in a magistrates' court, although a few may be sent for trial to the Crown Court along with other offences that may be tried there (for example assault). The vast majority of offences are also concluded in a magistrates' court (over 90% of cases).

Either way offences are intermediate offences such as theft and, with the exception of low-value criminal damage, maybe tried either summarily (by magistrates) or by judge and jury in the Crown Court. If the magistrates consider that an either way offence is too serious for them to deal with, they may "decline jurisdiction" which means that the defendant will have to appear in the Crown Court. Conversely, even if the magistrates accept jurisdiction, an adult defendant has a right to compel a jury trial. Defendants under eighteen years of age do not have this right and will be tried in a youth court (similar to a magistrates' court) unless the case is homicide or else is particularly serious.

A magistrates' court is made up in two ways. Either a group (known as a "bench") of "lay magistrates", or a district judge, will hear the case. A bench must consist of either two or three magistrates. Alternatively, a case may be heard by a district judge (formerly known as a stipendiary magistrate), who will be a qualified lawyer and will sit singly, but has the same powers as a lay bench. District judges usually sit in the more busy courts in cities or hear complex cases (e.g. extradition). Magistrates and District Judges have the same limited sentencing powers.

In the Crown Court, the case is tried before a recorder (part-time judge), circuit judge or a High Court judge, and a jury. The seniority of the judge depends on the seriousness and complexity of the case. The jury is involved only if the defendant enters a plea of "not guilty".

== Appeals ==
From the magistrates' courts, an appeal can be taken to the Crown Court on matters of fact and law or, on matters of law alone, to the Administrative Court of King's Bench Division of the High Court, which is called an appeal "by way of case stated". The magistrates' courts are also inferior courts and are therefore subject to judicial review.

The Crown Court is more complicated. When it is hearing a trial on indictment (a jury trial) it is treated as a superior court, which means that its decisions may not be judicially reviewed and appeal lies only to the Criminal Division of the Court of Appeal.

In other circumstances (for example when acting as an appeal court from a magistrates' court) the Crown Court is an inferior court, which means that it is subject to judicial review. When acting as an inferior court, appeals by way of case stated on matters of law may be made to the Administrative Court.

Appeals from the High Court, in criminal matters, lie only to the Supreme Court. Appeals from the Court of Appeal (Criminal Division) may also only be taken to the Supreme Court.

Appeals to the Supreme Court are unusual in that the court from which appeal is being made (either the High Court or the Court of Appeal) must certify that there is a point of law of general public importance. This additional control mechanism is not present with civil appeals and means that far fewer criminal appeals are heard by the Supreme Court.

== Civil cases ==
Under the Civil Procedure Rules 1998, civil claims under £10,000 are dealt with in the County Court under the "small claims track". This is generally known to the lay public as "small claims court" but does not exist as a separate court. Claims between £10,000 and £25,000 that are capable of being tried within one day are allocated to the "fast track" and claims over £25,000 to the "multi-track". These "tracks" are labels for the use of the court system – the actual cases will be heard in the County Court or the High Court depending on their value.

For personal injury, defamation cases, and in some landlord and tenant disputes, the thresholds for each track have different values.

== History ==
For nearly 300 years, from the time of the Norman Conquest until 1362, French was the language of the courts, rather than English. Until the twentieth century, many legal terms were still expressed in Latin. The Supreme Court of Judicature was formed in 1875 from the merging of various courts then existing, such as the

- Court of King's Bench
- High Court of Chancery
- Court of Exchequer
- High Court of Admiralty
- Court of Common Pleas
- Court of Probate and Matrimonial Causes
- Court of Common Pleas of the County Palatine of Lancaster
- Court of Pleas of the County Palatine of Durham and Sadberge

The Court of Appeal in Chancery was merged into the Court of Appeal.

Other historical courts include:

- House of Lords
- Star Chamber
- Court of High Commission
- Court of Criminal Appeal
- Court for Crown Cases Reserved
- Courts of piepowders (marketplace courts)
- Assize Court
- Restrictive Practices Court
- Courts leet
- Quarter sessions

=== Local courts of special jurisdiction ===
The courts of session of the County Palatine of Chester and the Principality of Wales were abolished section 14 of by the Law Terms Act 1830.

The Court of the County of Durham was abolished by section 2 of the Durham (County Palatine) Act 1836.

The Stannaries Court was abolished by the Stannaries Court (Abolition) Act 1896.

The following courts were merged into the High Court by section 41 of the Courts Act 1971 following the report by Dr. Beeching:

- The Court of Chancery of the County Palatine of Lancaster
- The Court of Chancery of the County Palatine of Durham and Sadberge

Section 42 replaced the Mayor's and City of London Court with a county court of the same name.

Section 43 abolished:

- The Tolzey and Pie Poudre Courts of the City and County of Bristol
- The Liverpool Court of Passage
- The Norwich Guildhall Court
- The Court of Record for the Hundred of Salford

Section 221 of the Local Government Act 1972 abolished the borough civil courts listed in Schedule 28 to that Act.

Part II of Schedule 4 to the Administration of Justice Act 1977 curtailed the jurisdiction of certain other anomalous local courts.

== See also ==
- Canon law
- Courts of Northern Ireland
- Courts of Scotland
- English law
- HM Courts Service
- Judiciary of England and Wales
- Legal year
- List of courts in England and Wales
- List of Supreme Court of Judicature cases
- Prisoner Escort and Custody Services
- Support Through Court
- Welsh law
