= Conduct prejudicial to good order and discipline =

Offense against military law

Conduct prejudicial to good order and discipline is an offence against military law in many countries. It has existed in military law since before the 17th century and is an important offence which functions as a catch-all to criminalise offences against military order which are not specified elsewhere.

== Background ==
The offence of "conduct prejudicial to good order and discipline" has been described as one of the offences that forms the "hardcore of military law". The offence is present in the military law of many countries and is often considered a catch-all offence to criminalise misconduct that is not specified elsewhere.

This kind of offence was first introduced to English military law in the 17th century, the law having previously been "minute in its details" with no catch-all article. However such articles were found in continental military law such as the Swedish Articles of Gustavus Adolphus issued in 1621 which allowed for "whatsoever is not contained in these articles, and is repugnant to military discipline ... shall the several commanders make good, or see severally punished". A form of this catch-all article was introduced to England in the Articles of War for 1625 which stated that "all other disorders whatsoever are to be punished, as these formerly nominated". This had been expanded on in the 1627 articles stated that "all other abuses and offences not specified in these orders shall be punished according to the discipline of war and opinions of such officers and others shall be called to make a Councell of Warr".

The article took on something of its modern form in 1642 when the Earl of Essex's Articles of War stated that "all other faults, disorders and offences, not mentioned in these articles, shall be punished according to the general customs and laws of war". The "conduct to the prejudice" concept was introduced at some point after 1700. By the late 18th century the offence had become article 23 of the British military law and allowed for the punishment of "all disorders or neglects ... to the prejudice of good order and military discipline". This part of British military law was adopted by the Continental Congress for use in the military of the United States in 1775. By 1835 the article was commonly known as the "Devil's article" within the British Army.

== Canada ==
The charge is covered by section 129 of the National Defence Act of 1922. The act allows for two separate offences: conduct prejudicial to good order and discipline or an act prejudicial to good order and discipline.

== Gambia ==
In Gambia the charge is covered by section 78 of the Gambia Armed Forces Act 1985.

== United Kingdom ==
In the British Armed Forces the offence is covered by section 19 of the Armed Forces Act 2006, which applies to all branches. The offence is categorised as an offence of "neglect of duty and misconduct" and the covers "an act that is prejudicial to good order and service discipline" or causing the same through omission. A person may be tried for the offence at a court martial or through a summary hearing in front of their commanding officer. Unlike some offences in the Armed Forces Act it is not applicable to civilians subject to service discipline.

A person found guilty of the offence may be punished by one or more of:

- Imprisonment not exceeding two years duration.
- Dismissal from His Majesty's service (with or without disgrace).
- Detention (in guardhouse or at the Military Corrective Training Centre) not exceeding two years duration. Only where the person being sentenced is not an officer.
- Forfeiture of part or all of accrued seniority. Only where the person being sentenced is an officer.
- Reduction in rank or disrating. Only for warrant or non-commissioned officers.
- A fine
- A community service order, only where the person being sentenced is also dismissed, is aged over 18 and resides in the UK.
- A formal reprimand for officers, warrant officers and NCOs.
- A service supervision and punishment order for a period of 30, 60 or 90 days for able seamen, marines, soldiers or airmen only. The offender forfeits one sixth of their pay for the period and may lose their leave entitlements and be made to perform extra work or drill.
- Ordered to pay compensation for any financial loss.

== United States ==
In the US Armed Forces the offence is covered by article 134 (the "general article") of the Uniform Code of Military Justice (UCMJ). This section states that "all disorders and neglects to the prejudice of good order and discipline in the armed forces" shall be tried by court martial and punished at the discretion of that court. The general article also covers offences which bring discredit upon the armed forces and "crimes and offenses not capital".

The UCMJ requires that all acts be directly prejudicial to good order and discipline. Examples of misconduct prosecuted under the act includes a chief petty officer "cross-dressing in public view", a sergeant who mooned another servicemember's wife, and a seaman making unauthorized long-distance calls. Examples of conduct listed in the Manual for Courts-Martial include adultery, bribery, fraternization, gambling, straggling, and indecent language.

== See also ==
- Conduct unbecoming
- Military discipline

== Bibliography ==
- Davidson, Michael J. (1999). A guide to military criminal law. Naval Institute Press. ISBN 1-55750-155-6.
- Nichols, Wing Commander D. B. (1963). The Devil's Article. Headquarters, Department of the Army (Australia).
