= Military justice =

Law governing members of the military

Military justice (or military law) is the body of laws and procedures governing members of the armed forces. Many nation-states have separate and distinct bodies of law that govern the conduct of members of their armed forces. Some states use special judicial and other arrangements to enforce those laws, while others use civilian judicial systems. Legal issues unique to military justice include the preservation of good order and discipline, the legality of orders, and appropriate conduct for members of the military. Some states enable their military justice systems to deal with civil offenses committed by their armed forces in some circumstances.

Military justice is distinct from martial law, which is the imposition of military authority on a civilian population as a substitute for civil authority, and is often declared in times of emergency, war, or civil unrest. Most countries restrict when and in what manner martial law may be declared and enforced.

== Canada ==
All Commands of the Canadian Forces (CF) (that is, Royal Canadian Navy, Canadian Army, Royal Canadian Air Force, Canadian Joint Operations Command, and Canadian Special Operations Forces Command) are primarily governed by the National Defence Act (NDA). Section 12 of the NDA§ authorizes the governor in council's creation of the Queen's Regulations and Orders (QR&Os). The QR&Os are subordinate legislation having the force of law. Since the principle of delegatus non-potest delegare has not achieved rigid standing in Canada, the QR&Os authorize other military officials to generate orders having similar, but not equal, status. These instruments can be found in the Canadian Forces Administrative Orders and Defence Administrative Orders and Directives; they are used as direction for authorities within the CF to administer the day-to-day considerations of the Forces. For example, officer cadets attending military college are organized and subject to regulations more appropriate for their academic success than the enforcement of discipline, as might be expected of fully trained members. Volume IV, Appendix 6.1 of The Queen's Regulations and Orders for the Canadian Military Colleges (QR Canmilcols) applies.

A judge advocate general (JAG) has headed the Canadian military legal branch since before the First World War. The branch interprets the Canadian Forces' own internal rules and in the Code of Service Discipline, and also international and humanitarian laws and codes of war, such as the Geneva Conventions. In Canadian practice, armed combat is a strictly regulated environment and legal officers are a crucial part of the planning that goes into operational decisions. The Military Law Centre on the grounds of Royal Military College of Canada, staffed with military lawyers, oversees the education of officers and troops in legal matters, trains military lawyers and advises Ottawa on matters of policy and doctrine. Legal education is integrated into the regular training that CF members undergo.

== Finland ==
Insignia of the Finnish Defence Forces legal branch

=== Jurisdiction ===
The Finnish military law concerns the members of the Finnish Defence Forces and the Finnish Border Guard. The military jurisdiction encompasses all military persons: conscripts, students training for a paid military position, females serving voluntarily and paid military personnel. However, military chaplains are outside the criminal military jurisdiction. Reservists belong to the military jurisdiction when activated voluntarily or involuntarily. The military jurisdiction starts from the moment when a person reports to duty or was liable to report to duty and lasts to the moment when the person has been discharged from service and, in case of conscripts and involuntarily activated reservists, has also left the military area. During wartime, also civilians serving in the Defence Forces or in civilian institutions that have been put under the direction of Defence Forces are under military jurisdiction. Enemy prisoners of war fall under Finnish military jurisdiction during their imprisonment.

=== Military crimes ===
As in Germany, persons under military jurisdiction are under the usual civilian criminal law. The military criminal law, the 45th Chapter of the penal code, encompasses only the crimes which only military persons can commit. The most important of these are various types of "service crime" (Finnish: palvelusrikos, Swedish: tjänstgöringsbrott) which encompasses all voluntary and negligent disobedience of orders and regulations, "guard crime" (Finnish: vartiorikos, Swedish: vakttjänstbrott), encompassing any misdeed during guarding duty, absence without leave (Finnish: luvaton poissaolo, Swedish: olovlig frånvaro), desertion (Finnish: sotakarkuruus, Swedish: överlöpning), diverse forms of disobedience against superiors, misuses of a position as superior and behaviour unsuitable for military person (Finnish: sotilaan sopimaton käyttäytyminen, Swedish: olämpligt uppträdande av krigsman). Other crimes are subject to usual civilian law.

The military has a jurisdiction to investigate all military crimes proper, and also a number of other crimes that have been specifically listed as belonging to the military jurisdiction. These include e.g. various types of murder, assault, theft, fraud, forgery, computer hacking and illegal divulging of classified information. However, they are only under military jurisdiction if the crime has been committed against another military person or against the Defence Forces.

Unlike other crimes, the military crimes have separate sentence ranges for peace and wartime. During wartime, the crimes carry considerably larger sentence ranges and, if the crime causes the danger to the military unit, the sentence range is even harsher. For example, desertion carries, in the peacetime, a sentence of disciplinary punishment or up to one year in prison. During wartime, it carries a mandatory prison sentence of not more than four years, and, if the crime caused a particularly immediate danger to the unit, a mandatory minimum of one year, with a maximum sentence of ten years.

When the military has jurisdiction over an ordinary crime, and the crime carries fine as a punishment, a disciplinary punishment may be given instead of fine both in summary proceedings and in the courts of law.

=== Investigation and summary discipline ===
When the crime falls under military jurisdiction, it is usually investigated by the serviceman's own unit. During such investigation, the serviceman's superior and the company commander have the power to detain the suspect. The battalion commander and military police officers have also the right to arrest the suspect and to conduct searches inside a military area.

When the company commander or his superior feels that the crime is non-trivial and requires professional investigation, they may submit the issue to the Defence Command for investigation. The Defence Command has, in addition to the power of arrest, the power to use almost all other measures that are available to the Finnish police. If the Defence Command requires the use of the most invasive investigative measures (e.g. wiretaps, use of deep cover agents or computer intrusion) they may either request the police to conduct the measure or hand over the case to the police, as agreed between the investigator and the competent policeman. If the police considers it necessary, they may always take the case over, however.

In the Border Guard, the Border Guard headquarters has the same internal law enforcement authority as the Defence Command in the Defence Forces, in addition to the regular law enforcement powers of the Border Guard.

When the investigation is ready, the case is brought to the company commander or sergeant major or for his superior for consideration. After hearing the suspect, the disposing superior either frees the suspect from suspicion or gives an appropriate punishment within the range allowed to him. The range is

- Company sergeant major: a private warning, up to three shifts of extra duty (only to conscripts and involuntarily activated reservists)
- Company commander: a private warning, up to five shifts of extra duty, up to 10 days of confinement to the garrison, a public letter of reprimand (Finnish: varoitus, Swedish: varning)
- Battalion commander, all of above, and up to fifteen days of confinement to garrison
- Brigade commander and his superiors: all of above and up to 30 disciplinary fines, one disciplinary fine being one fifth of the individual's daily gross income, or for conscripts, at least conscript's daily allowance.

During peacetime, professional soldiers (with the exception of certain soldiers deployed to international missions) cannot be given other disciplinary punishment than a public letter of reprimand or a fine.

If the superior does not feel that his powers allow him to give sufficient punishment, he will transfer the matter to the next higher superior. When the brigade commander determines that he cannot give sufficient punishment, he will transfer the matter to the public prosecutor who will commence prosecution in a civilian court. If the serviceman feels that the punishment was unjust, he can appeal to the brigade commander. The brigade commander's decision can be appealed to the district court within seven days. However, the appeals will not prevent the execution of the punishment.

=== Trial and appeals ===
The military crimes that go to court are handled by civilian courts that have military members. The district court has a learned civilian judge and two military members. One of them is an officer and the other a warrant officer, an NCO or a private. The court of appeals, that acts as the first instance for the prosecution of officers with at least major's rank, will have a military member who has at least a major's rank. The Supreme Court of Finland has two officers with at least colonel's rank as members when handling military crimes. These members are not named for a specific case but serve for two-year terms. The military members of the district court are selected by the court of appeals on the motion of the Commander of the Finnish Army. The military members of the Courts of Appeals are selected by the Ministry of Justice on motion of the Ministry of Defence. The military members of the Supreme Court are selected by the President of Finland.

The sentences of the courts for military crimes are served in civilian prisons. An exception is formed by the disciplinary arrest, which may be sentenced for up to 30 days and is served in the detention facilities of the convict's garrison.

When the military person holds a permanent or temporary paid position as a state military servant (Finnish: sotilasvirkamies, Swedish: militärtjänsteman), as all officers and NCOs in regular active service do, they will be sentenced to dismissal (Finnish: viraltapano, Swedish: avsättning) in addition to other punishments, if they are convicted of a military or a civilian crime for more than two years in prison and there are no special grounds for leniency. If the sentence is a life sentence, dismissal is mandatory. The court may also sentence dismissal with a shorter prison sentence if the crime shows that the person is unsuitable for state employment.

If the military person is no longer in service, the summary disciplinary procedure cannot be used and the military has no longer any law enforcement power over the issue. In such cases, the former service member is investigated by the civilian police but the case is handled by a court with military members. In sentencing, disciplinary punishments cannot be used. Instead if a disciplinary punishment, an ordinary day-fine is sentenced. Typically, this is the case when a reservist is absent from an obligatory refresher exercise or a conscript is, after the commission of crime, declared unfit for duty for medical or security reasons.

=== Administrative punishment ===
In addition to judicial dismissal, the Defence Forces and the Border Guard have the option of administratively ending the military person's service if the person is in a paid position. This can happen even if no criminal charges are pressed. In the Defence Forces, the professional serviceman can also be administratively suspended for a period of one to six months. Similarly to state military servants, persons serving in a deployed force on an international mission may be administratively dismissed by the commander of the Finnish contingent. A conscript or a reservist cannot be dismissed but their service can be suspended by the brigade commander if they are suspected of having committed a crime which shows that they may endanger the safety of others. Following this, the person may be declared permanently unfit for duty by the Defence Forces regional office for safety and security reasons.

As an exception to the principle that the military jurisdiction concerns only military persons, the penal code provides for the loss of military rank. Any person who is sentenced to prison for at least two years or to prison for any length of time for a crime of treasonous nature (specifically, crimes in chapters 11 and 12 of the Penal Code, e.g. espionage, high treason and related crimes), shall be sentenced to lose their military rank also. Thus, not only active military persons but also retired personnel, reservists and persons who are too old to belong to reserve may lose their military ranks for crimes of civilian nature.

=== Statistics ===
Military crimes are relatively common in Finland. Partly this is due to the fact that the bar of criminality has been set consciously low. The crime of absence without leave is committed by a soldier who is even a minute late, and a slightest wilful or negligent disregard for a standing order or a regulation fulfils the indicia of the "service crime". The legislator has purposefully given the military superiors the legal tools by which to maintain discipline by punishing even the slight appearances of bad conduct if they feel it necessary. On the other hand, handing out unofficial punishments is discouraged in the extreme.

The number of military crimes is yearly somewhat above 4,000. An absolute majority of these are handled by summary measures, i.e. by a punishments given by the military superiors. Only some 250 military crimes in a year end up for handling in district courts. The number of appeals is vanishingly small. In year 2014, courts of appeals handled only a total of 5 military criminal cases.

== Germany ==
Members of any branch of the Bundeswehr, the German armed forces, are subject to the ordinary civil jurisdiction and unless otherwise stated all civil laws apply to soldiers as well.

The German constitution allows the federal government in art. 96 II to create military courts under special circumstances: in times of war, outside Germany or on a German vessel, acting under a legal judge and only for members of the armed forces. In fact, no such laws have been enacted so far. Instead, suspects of crimes committed abroad are subject to the district attorney of the city of Potsdam. The reason is that the operational headquarters (Einsatzführungskommando) is located there.

Nonetheless, there exist numerous acts that only concern soldiers describing their special status, their rights and duties. The military penal code (Wehrstrafgesetz) applies to soldiers by extending the civil penal code (Strafgesetzbuch) to crimes that can be only committed on military duty: General offenses (such as desertion, illegal use of weapons and more) and offenses that interfere with the military hierarchy (such as mutiny or abuse).

Law enforcing inside any branch is done by the military police, the Feldjäger. When investigating, working for the attorney is equivalent to any German police in civil issues. In cases of both groups involved (on German terrain), regular and military police cooperate. In emergencies, the regular police is authorized to maintain order until the military police has arrived.

Soldiers that violate military regulations may also receive penalties in form of Non-judicial punishment or in severe cases judicial punishments by a special type of court. These procedures are defined by the military discipline code (Wehrdisziplinarordnung, WDO). The WDO describes how to proceed on offenses that are not (yet) covered by the military penal code but clearly against a military regulation. The head of the unit as immediate superior who acts as primary disciplinary master has the exclusive right to choose: non-judicial punishment (such as fines, curfews, arrests up to seven days), forwarding the decision to the next superior officer of the unit (arrest then can be extended up to 21 days) or calling the military service court (Truppendienstgericht) which has the power for further punishment (like degradation and shortening the salary up to five years). The judge of such a court is a civil one, two military officers are attending every case and act as consultants to the judge.

In Germany, there are no federal or military prisons. If a soldier is sentenced to jail for up to six months, the punishment is executed by the soldier's barracks administration. He will remain in arrest for the same time but continue serving in his unit on duty times unless the court has imposed further limits. Otherwise soldiers will be detained in civil state prisons. In the case of a soldier being sentenced to jail for one year or more (six months or more in case of bribery) he will be discharged from the armed forces.

== India ==
India has its own Army Act, Navy Act and Air Force Act. These laws define the statutory provisions as applicable to men and women in uniform. All these three Acts are available on search from the official website. There are certain para military forces in India too who have laws akin to the ones applicable to defence services. This includes the Border Security Force Act, Coast Guard Act, Indo-Tibetan Border Police Force Act and the Assam Rifles Act. All such Acts draw their inspiration from the Army Act.

The military courts in India are coming under extreme stress with the establishment of Armed Forces Tribunal in 2007. There is increasing voice in the country for the reform on the lines other liberal democracies are seeing in their military justice system.

== United Kingdom ==
The United Kingdom's arrangements for justice in the armed forces dates back many centuries to the Articles of War. In the late 19th Century this was added to the annual Army Act and embodied in the Naval Discipline Act. The Air Force Act was added in 1918. In 1966 a process of harmonisation started with the introduction of a quinquennial Armed Forces Act. The Armed Forces Act 2006 replaces the three separate service discipline acts and earlier Armed Forces Acts as the system of law under which the Armed Forces operate. In the previous decade the European Convention on Human Rights (ECHR) had considerable impact on the administration of military justice, particularly the need for the independence of the courts martial system. Nevertheless, the underlying premise of the service justice system is that discipline is a matter for commanders.

The Armed Forces Act 2006 completed the harmonisation of service law, and took full effect on 1 November 2009. Guidance about its application and related matters are provided in the Manual of Service Law. One motivating factor behind the changes in the legislation combining discipline acts across the armed forces is the trend towards tri-service operations and defence organisations. It deals with military offences, civil offences committed in some circumstances, offences by civilians associated with the armed forces or with the armed forces overseas (including family members), authority of Commanding Officer to deal with offences summarily, the Court Martial, the Service Civilian Court, custody and appeals. The Act also creates the post of the Director of Service Prosecutions.

Summary dealing by a Commanding Officer (CO) is the central feature: this is acceptable within the ECHR because an accused always has the right to elect trial by the Court Martial. Most cases are dealt with summarily. Typically a CO is a Lieutenant Colonel or equivalent (NATO grade OF-4), but a CO may delegate some powers of summary dealing to a subordinate. The superior officer of a CO, a Higher Authority, may vary a CO's powers of summary dealing. An implication is that every person subject to service law must have a CO, and a CO must have a Higher Authority.

The military judicial system is headed by the Judge Advocate General who is a civilian and part of the Ministry of Justice.

Administrative procedures enable a service man or woman to be discharged for unsatisfactory behaviour in a process similar to that in the private sector. They also allow a superior of any rank to award up to three extra duties or similar to a subordinate for minor infractions. Since being introduced this has significantly reduced the number of cases dealt with summarily.

== United States ==
The Continental Congress first applied military law to the Continental Army by adopting the British Article of War as they existed at the time of the American Revolution. George Washington and many of those who served in the Continental Army were already familiar with the Articles because of their service as militia and with the British forces in the colonies. Articles of War, June 30, 1775, Lore of the Corps. The Continental Navy applied the laws generally followed by the British Royal Navy and of other countries. Continental Navy. It was not until adoption of the Uniform Code of Military Justice that both the Army and the Navy (and the Air Force and Space Force) became subject to the same laws.

Article I, Section 8, United States Constitution, grants the U.S. Congress power to "make rules for the government and regulation of the land and naval forces." Congress issued these rules first in 1806 as the Articles of War. Military justice during the American Civil War was governed by the 1863 Lieber Code. The Articles of War were superseded in 1951 by the Uniform Code of Military Justice (UCMJ).

The UCMJ is federal law, found in Title 10 United States Code Chapter 47, and implemented by the Manual for Courts-Martial, an executive order issued by the President of the United States in his capacity as President (albeit the President is also the Commander-in-Chief of the United States Armed Forces).

All active duty service members are subject to trial by court-martial for crimes they commit regardless of when and where. The concept of personal jurisdiction was confirmed by the U.S. Supreme Court in Solorio v. United States. In addition, all retired members of the Regular Component are subject to this same jurisdiction for life. UCMJ art. 2, 10 U.S. Code 802. Because double jeopardy does not apply (except for prosecution in federal district court), a person can be tried in both civilian and court-martial for the same offenses.

Court-martial convictions in the United States may be appealed through military courts of appeal to the United States Court of Appeals for the Armed Forces (CAAF), a federal appellate court consisting of five civilian judges appointed by the President of the United States. CAAF decisions are subject to direct review by the Supreme Court of the United States.

The offenses covered by the UCMJ include those considered disciplinary offenses such as absence without leave (AWOL), disobedience of an order, or disrespect. Other crimes such as sexual assault, theft, espionage, robbery, murder are also punishable at court-martial. These are found in UCMJ arts. 80 through 134.

A court-martial is conducted very much like a trial in federal district court. The practices and procedures are similar as are the rules of evidence. The prosecution has the burden to establish guilty beyond reasonable doubt--this is the same in federal and all states court systems. The accused has the right to have a military lawyer assigned to her at no cost and the right to hire a civilian lawyer at her own expense. The trial is presided over by a Military Judge (MJ) who conducts the trial in the same way a District Court judge would in federal court.

== See also ==
- Court-martial
- Laws of war
- Martial law
- Military courtesy
