= Recruit Educational Center =

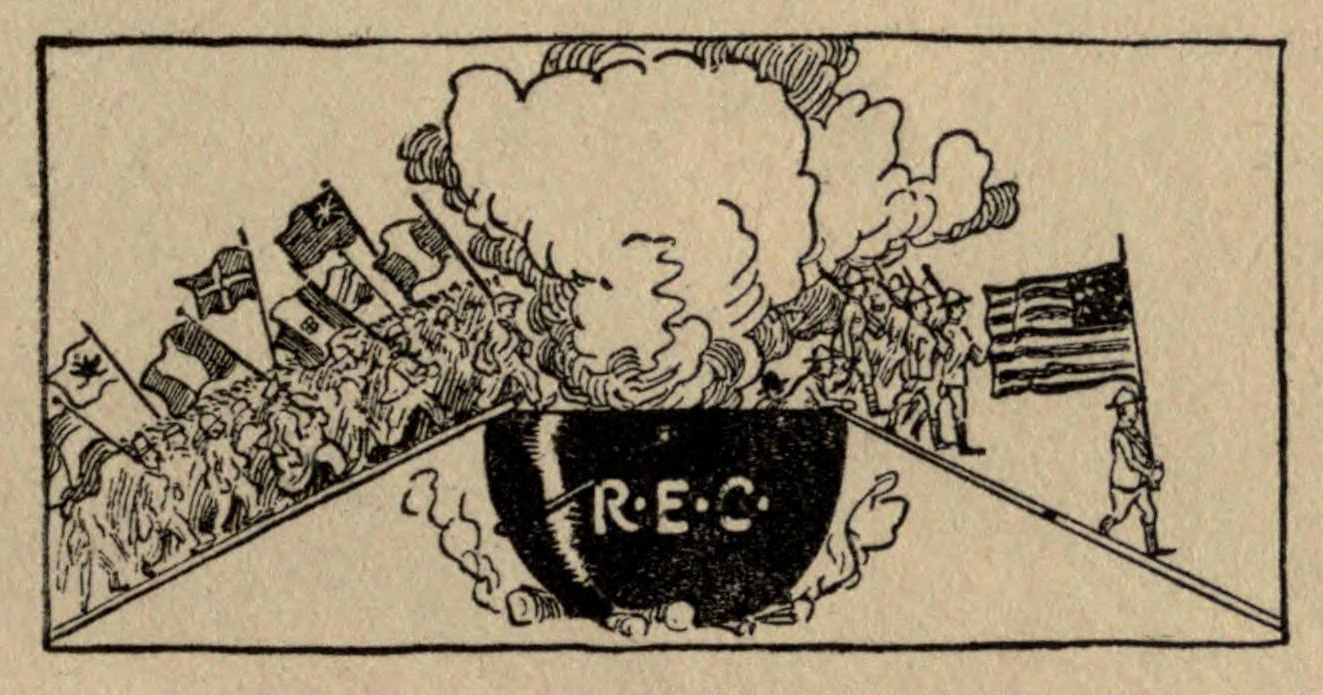
A cartoon from an instructors' pamphlet figuratively depicting the Recruit Educational Center as a melting pot

The Recruit Educational Center was a program started by the US War Department in May 1919 at Camp Upton. It provided language instruction and military training for non-English-speaking and illiterate military inductees. The Recruit Educational Center claimed a widened social role for the U.S. Armed Forces during peacetime. It also intervened in the era's virulent debates over eugenics, national identity, and the place of immigrants in American society.

While English-language fluency had been a prerequisite for enlistment in the US Armed Forces since the late nineteenth century, Congress suspended this restriction during the emergency of the Great War. After the Armistice, the Recruit Educational Center increased the number of citizens eligible for military service. Furthermore, it stipulated that alien soldiers who graduated and committed three years to the Army could become naturalized citizens. The program quickly attracted over 100,000 enlistees and in 1920 Congress appropriated funds for five additional branches.

In practice, the Recruit Educational Center served as an "Americanization" program aimed at immigrants from Eastern and Southern Europe and their second-generation relatives. While the Great War is often characterized as a watershed event that promoted more inclusive notions of multi-culturalism, these immigrants continued to be perceived by many native-born Americans as racially foreign to or inassimilable with the American body politic.

In addition to lessons in English grammar, vocabulary, and writing, the Recruit Educational Center also provided instruction in military protocol, U.S. history, geography, citizenship, and political economy. Among the lessons reportedly learned by the recruits were the shortcomings of labor unionism and the superiority of capitalism to Bolshevism. The whole experience was designed to "influenc[e] a foreigner’s environment, military duty, education, amusements, athletics, and religious observances that all combined may favorably react upon his character". In 1919, a cadre of recent graduates, representing fourteen different national backgrounds, was sent on a publicity tour to promote the Recruit Educational Center. During the tour, the group performed public demonstrations of "The Cadence System of Close Order Drill", a particularly grueling routine that demonstrated their remarkable efficiency and discipline.

Various prominent social commentators considered the Army's Recruit Educational Center a compelling solution to an urgent social problem. The Literary Digest approvingly identified Camp Upton as, "Where the melting-pot is boiling the hottest". The Outlook printed letters written by formerly illiterate recruits who described, in perfect English, their newfound identity as patriotic Americans willing to fight for their adopted country. A writer at the North American Review observed, "These men are being endowed with American minds, and taught to think American thoughts, and to look at things from an American point of view."
