= Laurence Marshall =

British Circuit judge

Laurence Arthur Marshall (1 June 1931 – 31 May 2011) was a British Circuit judge.

He was educated at Ardingly College and King's College London (LLB), and was called to the bar at Gray's Inn in 1956. He served as a Circuit judge from 1991 to 2003.
