= Charles Purle =

High Court judge

His Honour Charles Purle QC

Circuit judge (England and Wales)
- Appointed by: Queen Elizabeth II

Personal details
- Died: 5 May 2018 Thailand
- Children: 6
- Occupation: barrister, judge
- Profession: lawyer

Charles Purle, was a British senior Circuit Judge.

== Legal career ==
Purle's career started in 1970 when he was called to the bar. He was Head of Chambers at New Square Chambers and was appointed Queen's Counsel in 1989.

He was appointed as a Specialist Chancery Circuit Judge with effect from 21 June 2007, and was based in Midland Circuit, Birmingham Civil Justice Centre. He retired on 10 February 2018, after having extended his retirement which was originally due in 2017.

He died on 5 May 2018, in Thailand, while on holiday.
