= Conduct unbecoming =

Offense subject to court martial in some nations

Conduct unbecoming an officer and a gentleman (or conduct unbecoming for short) is an offense that is subject to court martial in the armed forces of some nations.

== Use in the United Kingdom ==
The phrase was used as a charge in courts martial of the British Armed Forces in the 18th and the early 19th centuries although it was not defined as a specific offence in the Articles of War. For instance, in 1813, Colonel Sir J Eamer was brought before a court martial "For behaving in a scandalous, infamous manner, such as is unbecoming the character of an officer and a gentleman, towards Captain B V Symes of the same regiment..." The charge seems to have been first codified under the Naval Discipline Act of 10 August 1860, which states, "Article 24: Every Officer subject to this Act who shall be guilty of Cruelty, or of any scandalous or fraudulent Conduct, shall be dismissed with Disgrace from Her Majesty's Service; and every Officer subject to this Act who shall be guilty of any other Conduct unbecoming the Character of an Officer shall be dismissed, with or without Disgrace, from Her Majesty's Service."

== Use in the United States ==
The offense is defined in the punitive code, Article 133, of the United States Uniform Code of Military Justice (UCMJ), enacted at 10 U.S.C. § 933.

Article 133. Any commissioned officer, cadet, or midshipman who is convicted of conduct unbecoming an officer shall be punished as a court-martial may direct.

— 10 U.S.C. § 933 (effective 2021)

The elements are:

1. That the accused did or omitted to do certain acts; and
2. That, in the circumstances, these acts or omissions constituted conduct unbecoming

Here "officer" is understood to include all commissioned officers, cadets, and midshipmen, hence the more common term conduct unbecoming.

The statute previously referred to "conduct unbecoming an officer and a gentleman", but the reference to "gentlemen" was removed by the National Defense Authorization Act of 2022.

== Police discipline ==
"Conduct unbecoming an officer" is also used in some civil police agencies.

== See also ==
- A Few Good Men, 1992 film centering around a trial for this offence
- An Officer and a Gentleman, 1982 film
- Conduct prejudicial to good order and discipline
- Conduct Unbecoming, 1975 film based on a play by Barry England
- Military tradition
- Unsportsmanlike conduct, a cautionable offence in association football, until 1997 called "ungentlemanly conduct".
