= Court-martial =

Judicial action in military forces

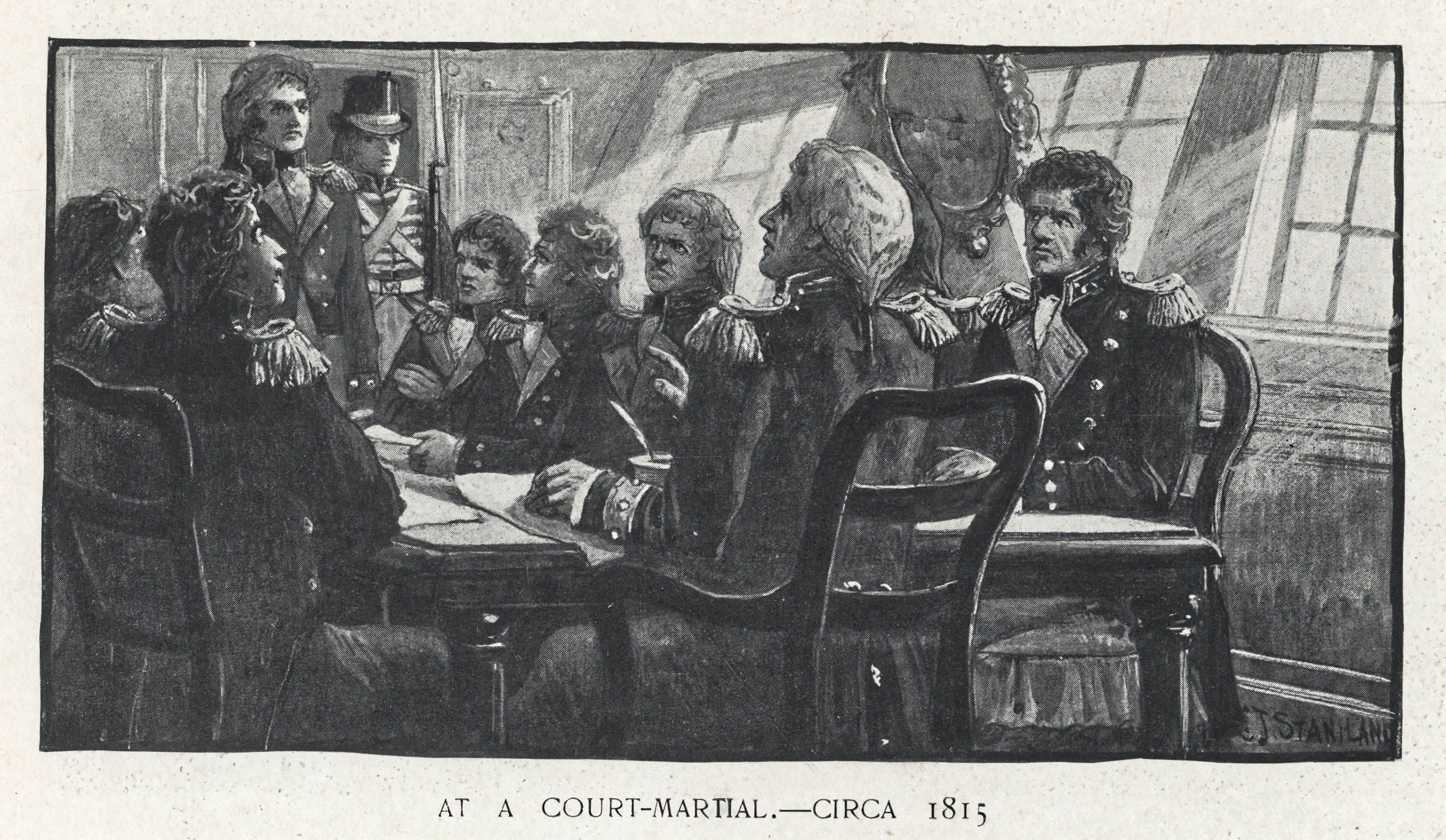
Illustration of a Royal Navy court-martial in 1815

A court-martial (plural courts-martial or courts martial) is a military court, or a trial conducted in such a court. A court-martial is empowered to determine the guilt of members of the armed forces subject to military law, and, if the defendant is found guilty, to decide upon punishment. In addition, courts-martial may be used to try prisoners of war for war crimes. The Geneva Conventions require that POWs who are on trial for war crimes be subject to the same procedures as would be the holding military's own forces. Finally, courts-martial can be convened for other purposes, such as dealing with violations of martial law, and can involve civilian defendants.

Most navies have a standard court-martial which convenes whenever a ship is lost; this does not presume that the captain is suspected of wrongdoing, but merely that the circumstances surrounding the loss of the ship be made part of the official record. Most military forces maintain a judicial system that tries defendants for breaches of military discipline. Some countries like France have no courts-martial in times of peace and use civilian courts instead.

== Hyphenation ==
Court-martial is hyphenated in US usage, whether used as a noun or verb. However, in British usage, a hyphen is used to distinguish between the noun, "court martial", and the verb, "to court-martial".

== Composition ==
Usually, a court-martial takes the form of a trial with a presiding judge, a prosecutor and a defense attorney (all trained lawyers as well as officers). The precise format varies from one country to another and may also depend on the severity of the accusation.

== Jurisdiction ==
Courts-martial have the authority to try a wide range of military offences, many of which closely resemble civilian crimes like fraud, theft or perjury. Others, like cowardice, desertion, and insubordination, are purely military crimes. For members of the British Armed Forces, offences are defined in the Armed Forces Act 2006. Regulations for the Canadian Forces are found in the Queen's Regulations and Orders as well as the National Defence Act. For members of the United States Armed Forces offenses are covered under the Uniform Code of Military Justice (UCMJ). These offences, as well as their corresponding punishments and instructions on how to conduct a court-martial, are explained in detail based on each country and/or service.

== By country ==
=== Canada ===
In Canada, there is a two-tier military trial system. Summary trials are presided over by superior officers, while more significant matters are heard by courts martial, which are presided over by independent military judges serving under the independent Office of the Chief Military Judge. Appeals are heard by the Court Martial Appeal Court of Canada. Capital punishment in Canada was abolished generally in 1976, and for military offences in 1998. Harold Pringle was the last Canadian soldier executed pursuant to a court martial, in 1945, having been convicted of murder.

=== China ===
The Military Court of the Chinese People's Liberation Army is the highest level military court (High Military Court, a special people's court executing the authority of the High People's Court) established by the People's Republic of China within the Chinese People's Liberation Army with jurisdiction over the nation's armed forces (including the People's Liberation Army and the People's Armed Police), organized as a unit under the dual leadership of the Supreme People's Court and the Political and Legal Committee of the Central Military Commission.

=== Finland ===
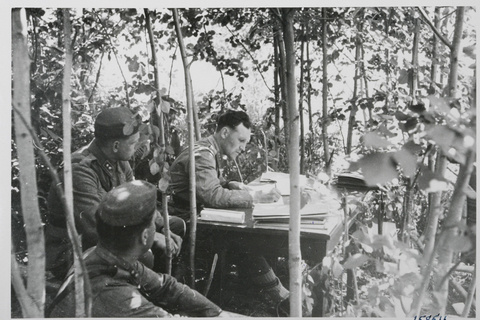
The Field Court Martial of the Finnish 15th Brigade in July 1944

In Finland, the military has jurisdiction over two types of crimes: those that can be committed only by military personnel and those normal crimes by military persons where both the defendant and the victim are military persons or organizations and the crime has been defined in law as falling under military jurisdiction. The former category includes military offences such as various types of disobedience and absence without leave, while the latter category includes civilian crimes such as murder, assault, theft, fraud and forgery. However, war crimes and sexual crimes are not under military jurisdiction.

In crimes where the military has jurisdiction, the military conducts the investigation. In non-trivial cases, this is done by the investigative section of Defence Command or by civilian police, but trivial cases are investigated by the defendant's own unit. The civilian police has always the right to take the case from the military.

If the case does not warrant a punishment greater than a fine or a disciplinary punishment, the punishment is given summarily by the company, battalion or brigade commander, depending on severity of the crime. If the brigade commander feels that the crime warrants a punishment more severe than he can give, he refers the case to the local district attorney who commences prosecution.

The crimes with military jurisdiction are handled by the civilian district court which has a special composition. In military cases, the court consists of a civilian legally trained judge and two military members: an officer and a warrant officer, an NCO or a private soldier. The verdict and the sentence are decided by a majority of votes. However, the court cannot give a more severe sentence than the learned member supports. The appeals can be made as in civilian trials. If a court of appeals handles a military matter, it will have an officer member with at least a major's rank. The Supreme Court of Finland has, in military cases, two general officers as members.

Courts-martial proper are instituted only during a war, by decree of the government. Such courts-martial have jurisdiction over all crimes committed by military persons. In addition, they may handle criminal cases against civilians in areas where ordinary courts have ceased operation, if the matter is urgent. Such courts-martial have a learned judge as a president and two military members: an officer and an NCO, warrant officer or a private soldier. The verdicts of a war-time court-martial can be appealed to a court of appeals.

=== Germany ===
The Basic Law for the Federal Republic of Germany establishes in Art. 96 para. 2 that courts-martial can be established by federal law. Such courts-martial would take action in a state of defence or against soldiers abroad or at sea.

=== Greece ===
The existence of military courts, naval courts and air courts is provided for in the Constitution of Greece, which in article 96 paragraph 4 states that:

Special laws define: a. Those related to military courts, naval courts and air courts, to the jurisdiction of which private individuals cannot be subject.

The first chapter of the procedural part of the Military Penal Code (MPC) regulates the matters related to the courts and judicial persons that make up the Military Justice. Specifically in article 167 of the MPC, it is defined that criminal justice in the Army is awarded by the military courts (military courts, air courts, naval courts, review court) and the Supreme Court.

=== India ===
There are four kinds of courts-martial in India. These are the General Court Martial (GCM), District Court Martial (DCM), Summary General Court Martial (SGCM) and Summary Court Martial (SCM). According to the Army Act, army courts can try personnel for all kinds of offenses, except for murder and rape of a civilian, which are primarily tried by a civilian court of law. The President of India can use the judicial power under Article 72 of the constitution to pardon, reprieve, respite or remission of punishment or sentence given by a court martial.

=== Indonesia ===
In Indonesia, any criminal offense conducted by military personnel will be held in trial by military court. There are four levels of military jurisdiction:

- Military Court (Pengadilan Militer), composed of one major as presiding judge, two captains as judge, one captain as military prosecuting attorney, and one second lieutenant as clerk of court.
- High Military Court (Pengadilan Militer Tinggi), composed of one lieutenant colonel as presiding judge, two majors as judge, one major as military prosecuting attorney, and one captain as clerk of court.
- Supreme Military Court (Pengadilan Militer Utama), composed of one colonel as presiding judge, two lieutenant colonels as judge, one lieutenant colonel as military prosecuting attorney, and one major as clerk of court.
- Warzone Military Court (Pengadilan Militer Pertempuran), composed of one colonel as presiding judge, two lieutenant colonels as judge, one lieutenant colonel as military prosecuting attorney, and one major as clerk of court. This level of military court only applies during wartime.

The judges will receive temporary rank the same as the defendant if the rank of the defendant is higher than the judges.

=== Ireland ===
Courts martial are provided for in the Constitution of Ireland, which states in Article 38.4.1 that:

"Military tribunals may be established for the trial of offences against military law alleged to have been committed by persons while subject to military law and also to deal with a state of war or armed rebellion."

There are three classes of courts martial in the Irish Defence Forces:

- The Summary Court-Martial (SCM) is tried by a Military Judge sitting alone. Sentences are limited to six months imprisonment.
- The Limited Court-Martial (LCM) is tried by a Military Judge and a board of three members of the Defence Forces. Sentences are limited to two years imprisonment.
- The General Court-Martial (GCM) is tried by a Military Judge and a board of five members of the Defence Forces. The GCM has no sentencing limit. Officers of Lieutenant-Colonel rank and higher can only be tried by a GCM.

=== Israel ===
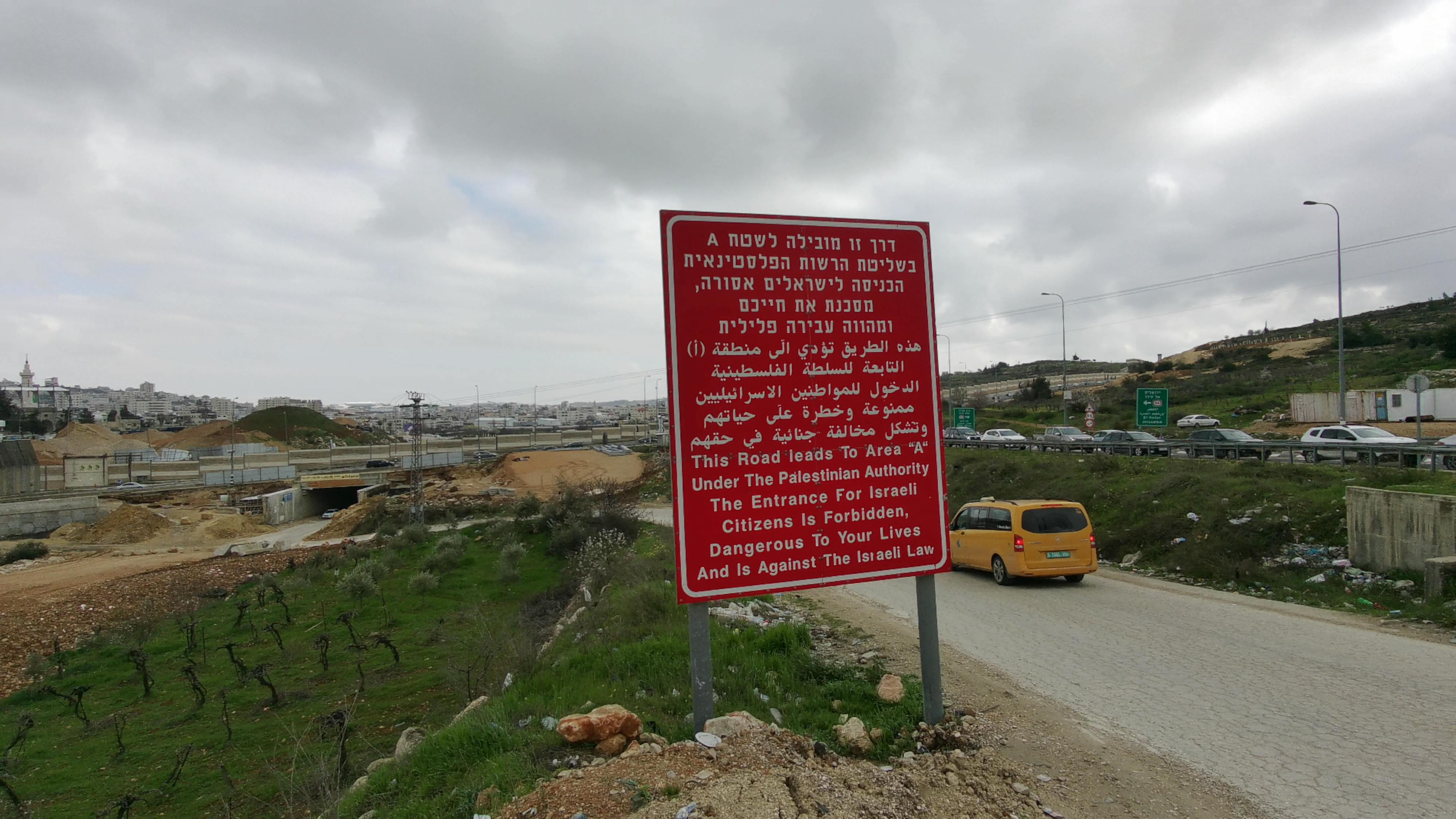
Area A "red sign" near Bethlehem in the West Bank.

The West Bank is governed by a complex system of Israeli, Palestinian Authority, or shared jurisdictions under both civilian and military courts under the terms of the Oslo Accords. In some areas, Israeli military courts are often the de facto legal authority barring a longer term agreement of borders between Israel and the Palestinian Authority. (Note: The Israeli occupation of the West Bank and Gaza is the longest military occupation in modern times.)

=== Luxembourg ===
In Luxembourg, there are three levels of military jurisdiction:

- The lowest is the Council of War which is composed of one lieutenant-colonel (or higher), one captain (or higher) and one civilian judge of a District Court.
- The Military Court of Appeal is composed of two high magistrates of a civilian Court of Appeal and one Major (or higher).
- At the top is the Military High Court which deals not only with military cases, but also with acts of high treason, sabotage, organized forms of terrorism and crimes against humanity. It is composed of two magistrates of a civilian Court of Appeal, one judge of a civilian District Court and one Lieutenant-Colonel (or higher) of the Army.

=== Netherlands ===
In the Netherlands, members of the military are tried by a special military section of the civilian court in Arnhem. This section consists of a military member and two civilian judges. The decision whether or not to prosecute is primarily made by the (civilian) attorney general.

=== New Zealand ===
Service members of the New Zealand Defence Force are tried under a court martial for offences pertaining to the most serious offences against the Armed Forces Discipline Act 1971. Offences such as mutiny, murder, sexual offences, serious assaults, drug offences, or offences where the maximum punishment exceeds a 7-year prison term will be heard by court martial. Below this 7-year threshold the accused is dealt with by their commanding officer in what is known as a summary trial.

During court martial the appointed judge is either a New Zealand High Court or District Court judge and they preside over the trial. Defendants are assigned legal counsel, and for the prosecution, a lawyer is assigned who generally comes from a military background. The judge advocate is usually made up of senior NZDF officers and warrant officers who hear the defence and prosecution evidence during court martial. Punishment on guilty findings of a defendant will see them face being charged with a punishment such as serious reprimand, loss of rank, dismissal from the NZDF, or being sent to military or civilian prison.

=== Poland ===
In Poland, military courts are military garrison courts and military district courts. They are criminal courts with jurisdiction over offences committed by soldiers in active military service, as well as certain offences committed by civilian military personnel and soldiers of the armed forces of foreign countries (Article 647 of the Code of Criminal Procedure). Garrison courts rule in the first instance, appeals against their decisions and orders are heard by district courts, which also have first-instance jurisdiction in the most serious cases. The Criminal Chamber of the Supreme Court then acts as the second instance; in addition, cassation appeals against judgments rendered in the second instance are heard in the Criminal Chamber. The military courts are therefore subject to the adjudicatory supervision of the Supreme Court (which, by the way, follows from Article 183(1) of the Constitution of the Republic of Poland), and the Minister of Justice has superior organizational and administrative supervision.

=== Philippines ===
In 2005, ex-AFP Major General Carlos Garcia (PMA Class of 1971, assigned comptroller of the AFP was court martialled for violating two articles of the Articles of War for the alleged Php 303 million Peso Money Laundering/Plunder and direct Bribery against him.

=== Singapore ===
Under the Singapore Armed Forces Act, any commissioned officer is allowed to represent servicemen when they are tried for military offences in the military courts. The cases are heard at the Court-Martial Centre at Kranji Camp II. Some of the courts martial in Singapore include that of Capt. G. R. Wadsworth in 1946 due to use of insubordinate language and, in the modern day, misbehaviour by conscripted servicemen.

=== Thailand ===
The governing law in Thailand's military courts is the Military Court Organisation Act 1955 (Thai: พระราชบัญญัติธรรมนูญศาลทหาร พ.ศ. ๒๔๙๘). The act allows the Judge Advocate General of Thailand (Thai: เจ้ากรมพระธรรมนูญ) to establish court regulations. In wartime or during the imposition of martial law, military courts may adopt special procedures.

=== United Kingdom ===
The Court Martial is one of the Military Courts of the United Kingdom. The Armed Forces Act 2006 established the Court Martial as a permanent standing court. Previously courts-martial were convened on an ad hoc basis with several traditions, including usage of swords. The Court Martial may try any offence against service law. The court is made up of a judge advocate, and between three and seven (depending on the seriousness of the offence) officers and warrant officers. Rulings on matters of law are made by the judge advocate alone, whilst decisions on the facts are made by a majority of the members of the court, not including the judge advocate, and decisions on sentence by a majority of the court, this time including the judge advocate.

=== United States ===
Most commonly, courts-martial in the United States are convened to try members of the U.S. military for violations of the Uniform Code of Military Justice (UCMJ), which is the U.S. military's criminal code. However, they can also be convened for other purposes, including military tribunals and the enforcement of martial law in an occupied territory. Courts-martial are governed by the rules of procedure and evidence laid out in the Manual for Courts-Martial, which contains the Rules for Courts-Martial, Military Rules of Evidence, and other guidance. There are three types: Special, Summary, and General.

== Fictional examples ==
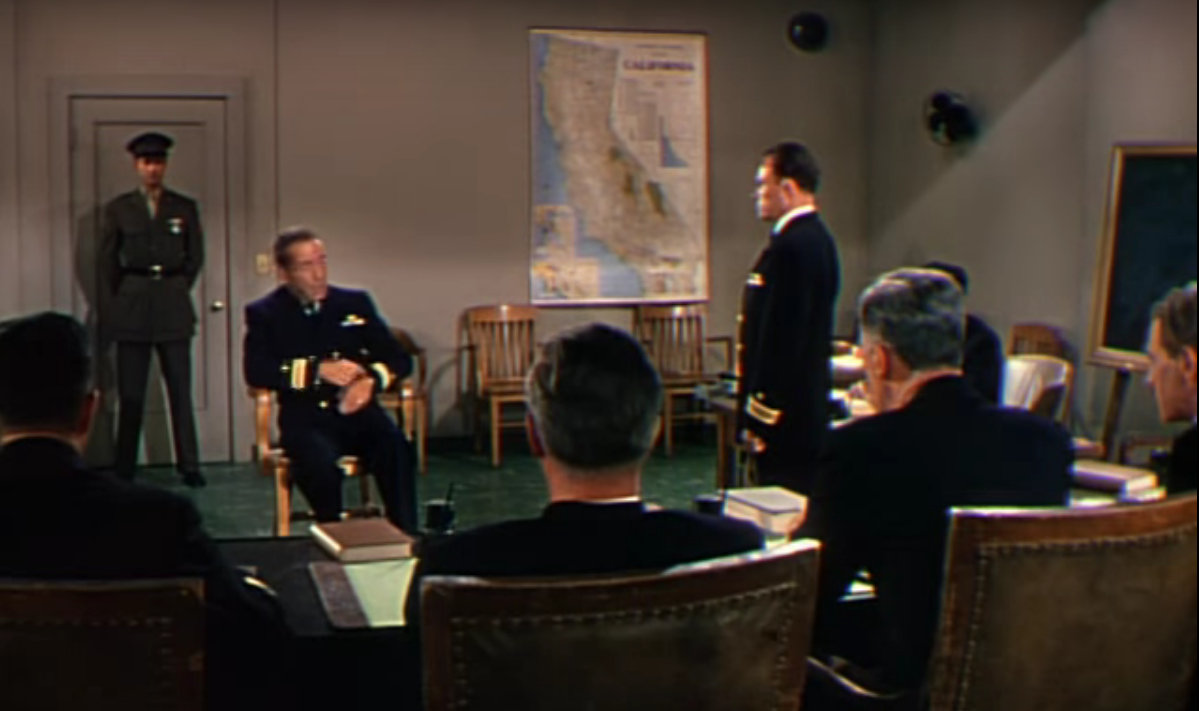
A court-martial scene in the 1954 film The Caine Mutiny

In Herman Melville's novella Billy Budd (first published 1924), the title character is convicted at a drumhead court-martial of striking and killing his superior officer on board HMS Indomitable, is sentenced to death, and is hanged. The novella has been adapted for the stage, film and television; notably in Benjamin Britten's 1951 opera Billy Budd.

In C.S. Forester's 1938 novel Flying Colours, Captain Horatio Hornblower is court-martialled for the loss of HMS Sutherland. He is "most honourably acquitted".

In Michael Morpurgo's novel Private Peaceful, the main character of "Tommo" reflects on the childhoods of himself and his brother, Charlie as Charlie awaits a court martial during WWI, which he receives at the end of the story for disobeying orders and cowardice in the face of the enemy.

Several courts-martial occur in the British naval TV series Warship, including notably that of Lieutenant Palfrey, a Royal Marines officer accused of killing a foreign officer during a military exercise, and that of Fleet Air Arm pilot Edward Glenn, brother of Alan Glenn, one the principal characters, charged with a range of offences relating to a dangerous flight manoeuvre.

In the Star Trek:The Original Series episode "Court Martial", Captain James T. Kirk is court-martialed for the jettisoning and subsequent death of ship's records officer Lt. Benjamin Finney while inside a research pod during an ion storm as seen in "The Galileo Seven".

In the Star Trek: The Next Generation episode "The Battle", it is stated that, Picard was court-martialed for the loss of the Stargazer and zealously prosecuted by Phillipa Louvois. In the end, he was absolved of all charges.

The 1992 film A Few Good Men (and the play on which it was based) deals almost entirely with the court martial of two enlisted Marines.

In the 2008 to 2020 science-fiction animated TV series Star Wars: The Clone Wars's 2011 fourth-season episode "Plan of Dissent", clone troopers Fives and Jesse, both serving in the Grand Army of the Republic, act against orders from their acting superior in a war situation and in revenge are threatened with court-martial and consequent execution. They find themselves court-martialed and about to be executed by firing squad in the next episode, although the final execution does not happen despite them being found guilty.

== See also ==
- Cashiering
- Military trial films
