= Family Justice System of England and Wales =

The Family Justice System of England and Wales is a branch of the Courts of England and Wales that deals with disputes within families through family law. Disputes are resolved in the family magistrates court and in the Family Division of the High Court. The matters considered by the court include those arising from marriage, divorce, financial payments following divorce, protection from domestic abuse and the risk of domestic abuse, child custody matters, adoption cases, cases surrounding artificial insemination, and the medical treatment of children.

Legislation creates some obligations of the state to children, disputes involving such matters are dealt with by public family law.

In 2021, 265,308 cases entered the family court system. There were 38,528 domestic violence orders and 1,054 adoption applications.

== History ==
Prior to the Guardianship of Infants Act 1925 in the case of divorce to married parents the father of a child was given custody over a child. The guardianship act gave courts the ability to rule on some disputes about the upbringing of a child. The Legitimacy Act 1959 gave courts the ability to rule on children born to unmarried parents. The Matrimonial Proceedings Act 1958 required all divorcing parents to file a statement of arrangements for the upbringing of a child which a court approved.The foundation of current family law in England and Wales was the Children Act 1989. The Children Act introduced a no order principle, where no order will be made unless it improves the welfare of a child.

The Legal Aid, Sentencing and Punishment of Offenders Act 2012, LASPO, reduced funding for family courts. An earlier report in 2010 had argued that legal aid funding led to drawn out cases. By April 2017 the number of cases where both parties did not have legal representation had increased to 36% from 17% in 2013.

== Transparency ==
Courts in England and Wales have a principle of open justice where hearings are held in public but family courts are held in private because it has been felt that this protects children. Concerns have been expressed in some sections of the media about a lack of accountability in the family courts. Some members of the Judiciary called for more people to have access to family courts. Certain judgments from the family are made public with some being available on BAILII.

== Litigants in person ==
Legal aid is generally not available for decisions involving child arrangements, which leads to parents representing themselves in court. Ligitants representing themselves cause delays in cases when compared to those who are represented by a lawyer. There are examples of the judiciary having to research law itself because the litigant does not present complex legal arguments well. There are cases where the behaviour of a litigator representing themselves in an emotionally charged setting have led judges to make negative conclusions about that litigator relevant to the case.

Legal aid is available for those who make accusations of domestic abuse or child abuse but not for those accused. Parents for whom there is no evidence of abuse can apply to the court for a non-molestation order and use this as evidence for obtaining legal aid and can apply for means-tested legal aid to apply for this non-molestation order. Protective injunctions such as a non-molestation are the most common evidence given for domestic abuse. People can apply for non-molestation orders without informing the party to whom the order applies and those responding to the order do not have access to legal aid.

== Use of expert witnesses and research ==
In research internationally, scholars express fear about the misuse of social science literature as evidence in trials. Scholars argue that research may be used selectively to support arguments specific to a case and lawyers may lack the knowledge to cross-examine researchers. Some Judges were found to distrust evidence given working for local authorities and there were concerns about the lack of expertise.

A scoping review in 2016 looked at attitudes to research in courts. Judges would try to keep up with social science research in general terms but would not introduce such evidence themselves to court relying on the advocates in the case to do so. Judges and lawyers are concerned about how authoritative research is and whether it includes a consideration of contradictory research. There is concern that research commissioned by Government Departments may be biased.

In 2021, the President of the Family Division issued a memorandum regarding the criteria for use of expert witnesses citing Kennedy v Cordia (Services) LLP (Scotland). The criteria included expertise that will assist the court, impartiality, that the expert be necessary for the proceedings, and certain criteria surrounding bodies of knowledge. The memorandum states that the court will refuse to accept evidence where the methodology is not based on established body of knowledge.

== Parental alienation ==
In 2017 and 2018 petitions were arranged by pressure groups calling for the legislatures of England and Wales to recognise parental alienation, where one parent attempts to cause a child to have negative feelings towards their other parent. The Welsh branch of CAFCASS commissioned an independent literature review. While parental alienation is distinguished from cases where a parent's own action causes a child to dislike them such as poor parenting or domestic abuse, researchers have found that claims of parental alienation and domestic abuse can occur at the same time. The research on parental alienation was found to often use self-report and retrospective reviews making identifying causality difficult and while there are various measures for parental alienation none were considered reliable by the review. Some barristers have claimed that parental alienation is used as a counter-allegation in response to claims of domestic abuse.

In October 2022, an appeal to be heard by Andrew McFarlane was brought about the necessary credentials of expert witness giving evidence on parental alienation following an expert witness who had no psychological qualifications giving evidence. This witness had been accepted by both parties in the case.
