= AGAI 67 =

British Army administrative disciplinary procedure

Army General Administrative Instruction 67 (AGAI 67) is a British Army administrative disciplinary procedure. It has come under criticism in a report to the Defence Select Committee which described it as being unfairly weighted in the favour of the chain of command, and lacking transparency or accountability.

== See also ==
- Offences against military law in the United Kingdom
