= Court Martial Appeal Court =

British superior court of record

The Court Martial Appeal Court is a British superior court of record which hears appeals from courts martial.

== History ==
The Court was originally established in 1951 as the Courts-Martial Appeal Court under the Courts-Martial (Appeals) Act 1951. Its organisation was modified by the Courts-Martial (Appeals) Act 1968. It was renamed as Court Martial Appeal Court by the Armed Forces Act 2006 to reflect the establishment of the Court Martial as a permanent standing court.

== Composition ==
The Court is composed of English High Court, Court of Appeal and Court of Judicature of Northern Ireland judges nominated by the following:

- Lord Chief Justice of England and Wales
- Lords Commissioners of Justiciary nominated by the Lord Justice General
- Lord Chief Justice of Northern Ireland.

The Lord Chancellor can also appoint "persons of legal experience" to the Court.

In addition, any English High Court judge, Scottish Lord Commissioner of Justiciary, or judge of the Court of Judicature of Northern Ireland may exercise the powers of the Appeal Court, whether he is a judge of the Appeal Court or not.

== Appeals ==
Appeals from the Court Martial Appeal Court lie to the Supreme Court of the United Kingdom.
