= Courtesy =

Gentle politeness and courtly manners

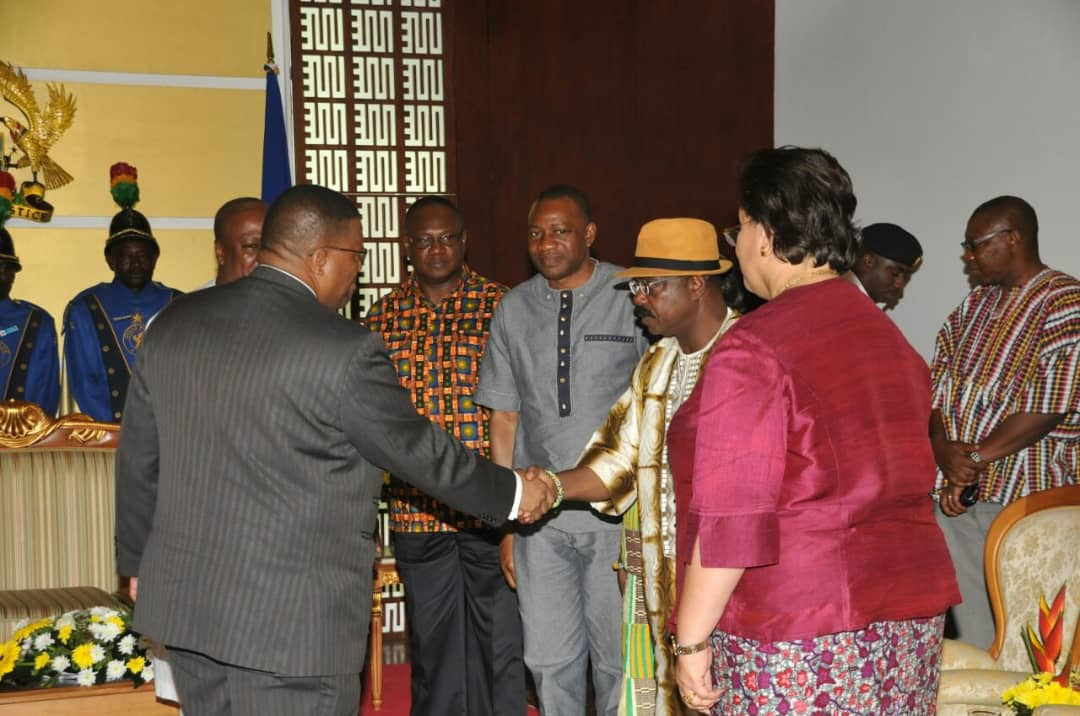

Courtesy (from the word courteis, from the 12th century) is gentle politeness and courtly manners. In the Middle Ages in Europe, the behaviour expected of the nobility was compiled in courtesy books.

== History ==
The apex of European courtly culture was reached in the Late Middle Ages and the Baroque period (i.e. roughly the four centuries spanning 1300–1700). The oldest courtesy books date to the 13th century, but they become an influential genre in the 16th, with the most influential of them being Il Cortegiano (1508), which not only covered basic etiquette and decorum but also provided models of sophisticated conversation and intellectual skill.

The royal courts of Europe persisted well into the 18th century (and to some limited extent to the present day), but in the 18th century, the notion of courtesy was replaced by that of gallantry, referring to an ideal emphasizing the display of affected sensitivity in direct contrast with the ideals of self-denial and dignified seriousness that were the Baroque norm. During the late medieval and early modern period, the bourgeois class tended to emulate the courtly etiquette of their betters. This changed in the 19th century, after the end of the Napoleonic Wars, with the emergence of a middle class with its own set of bourgeois etiquette, which in turn was mocked in the classist theory of Marxism as petite bourgeoisie.

The analogue concept in the court culture of medieval India was known by the Sanskrit term dakṣiṇya, literally meaning "right-handedness", but as in English dexterity having a figurative meaning of "apt, clever, appropriate", glossed as "kindness and consideration expressed in a sophisticated and elegant way".

== See also ==
- Military courtesy
