= Family proceedings court =

Magistrates' court when the court's family panel sat to hear a family case, up to 2014

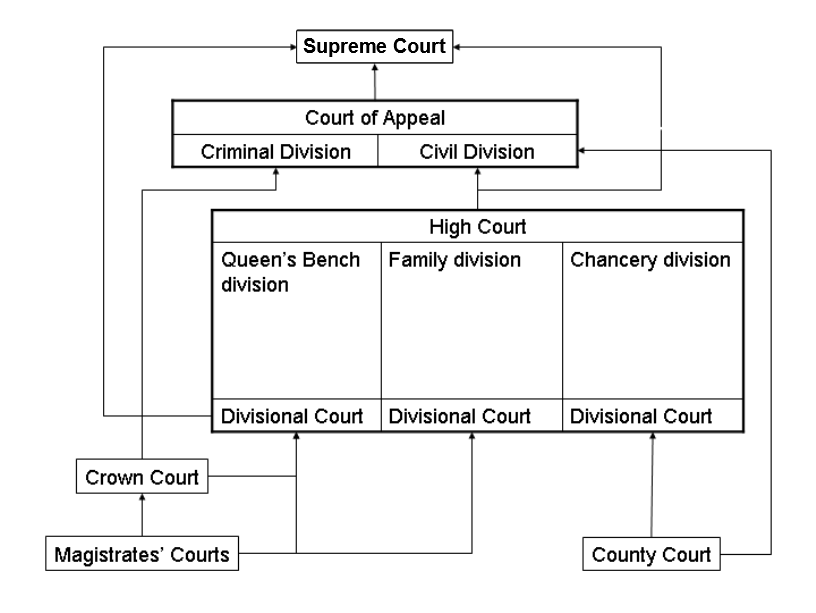
Schematic of court system for England and Wales

In England and Wales, family proceedings court was the name given to a magistrates' court when members of the court's family panel sat to hear a family case. It was a court of first instance in England and Wales that dealt with family matters. Cases were either heard in front of a bench of lay magistrates or a district judge (magistrates' courts).

From 22 April 2014 the family proceedings court has ceased to exist and its functions were absorbed into the new single Family Court following the enactment of the Crime and Courts Act 2013. Magistrates continue to sit in family proceedings in the way described but within a different court arrangement.

== Jurisdiction ==
The family proceedings court's jurisdiction was derived from the Magistrates' Courts Act 1980.

The Children Act 1989 provided the basis for most applications dealing with children. Beyond the Children Act 1989, magistrates continue to have quite separate powers to make maintenance orders between spouses to protect them from one another, to protect ‘associated persons’ and to regulate occupation of the family home. The main provisions that affected law and procedure in the family proceedings court were:

a. Domestic Proceedings and Magistrates' Courts Act 1978
b. Magistrates' Courts Act 1980
c. Adoption and Children Act 2002
d. Child Support Act 1991
e. Children Act 1989
f. Family Law Act 1996

=== Public law and private law cases ===
The family proceedings court played a key role in what are called:

a. Public law cases (e.g. applications for care or supervision orders in respect of children who are at risk, usually brought by local authorities)
b. Private law cases (e.g., disputes between parents concerning the upbringing of children)

=== Other work ===
a. Applications by spouses for financial provision for themselves, i.e., provision for parties who remain married—maintenance arrangements for

children are for the most part dealt with by the Child Support Agency (CSA)

b. Non-molestation orders to prevent domestic violence and involving, where appropriate, the use of powers to arrest
c. Occupation orders to keep a spouse out of the family home and also involving,

where appropriate, the use of powers to arrest

d. Declaration of parentage
e. Adoption, i.e., orders giving parental rights and duties in respect of a child to adoptive parents
f. Enforcement concerning, for example:

i. Childrens Act 1989 cases
ii. Orders for financial provision for spouses, including enforcement of assessments by the CSA and of maintenance orders from abroad, and vice versa (known as 'reciprocal enforcement')

g. Variation and enforcement of ‘old’ maintenance cases.

== Rules of court ==
The rules of the family proceedings court were in The Family Procedure Rules 2010. Where those rules are silent on a matter then the Magistrates' Courts Rules 1981 (as amended) applied.

== Constitution ==
Family proceedings courts must be made up of three magistrates from the family panel and include a man and a woman, unless this is impracticable, when a minimum of two is allowed. A family proceedings court may comprise a district judge as chairman and one or two lay justices who are members of the family panel. If this is not practicable the district judge may sit alone.

== Family panel ==
Family panels are made up of magistrates elected by their local colleagues for this work on the basis of their aptitude and personal suitability (except in London where different arrangements exist). In addition to their special duties in the family proceedings court, members of the panel continue to serve in the ordinary magistrates’ court. Different arrangements for the selection of magistrates to sit in the family proceedings court are likely to be in place in 2006 after the Courts Act 2003 is fully implemented.

=== Chairmen and deputy chairmen ===
The panel appoints its own chairman. It also elects enough deputy court chairmen to ensure that family proceedings are always chaired by someone trained for this role. Different provision for chairmen will also be in place from 2006.

== Appeal from magistrates' court in family matters ==
Provisions contained within the Access to Justice Act 1999 (Destination of Appeals) (Family Proceedings) Order 2009 s.4 insert s.111A into the Magistrates' Courts Act 1980. This section dictates that:

(1) This section applies in relation to family proceedings in a magistrates' court.

(2) Any person who was a party to any proceeding before the court, or is aggrieved by the order, determination or other proceeding of the court, may question the proceeding on the ground that it is wrong in law or is in excess of jurisdiction by appealing to a county court.

Subsequently, all appeals from a magistrates' court will now be dealt with by the County Court and will have 21 days in which to file the appeal. [s.111A(4)]

== See also ==
- Courts of England and Wales
- Magistrates' court (England and Wales)
- Family law
