= Circuit judge (England and Wales) =

Type of judge in the United Kingdom

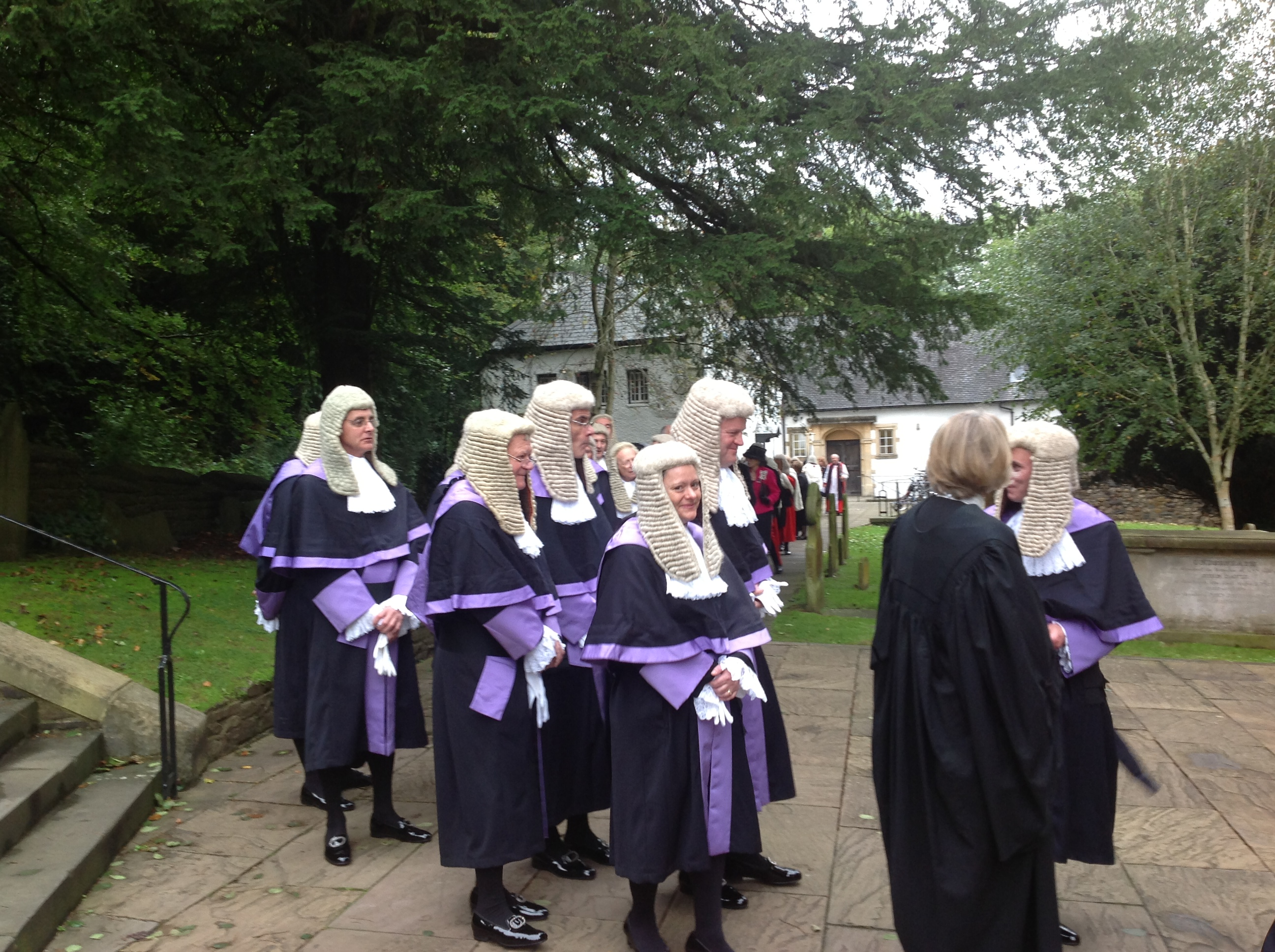
Circuit judges in their ceremonial robes in procession at Llandaff Cathedral in 2013

Circuit judges are judges in England and Wales who sit in the Crown Court, the Family Court, the County Court and some specialized sub-divisions of the High Court of Justice, such as the Technology and Construction Court. There are currently over 600 circuit judges throughout England and Wales.

The office of circuit judge was created by the Courts Act 1971 and replaced the former offices of chairman of quarter sessions and borough recorder. All County Court Judges were also redesignated as circuit judges. Circuit judges are styled His or Her Honour Judge X and are addressed as "Your Honour", except when sitting at the Old Bailey or as a High Court judge, in which case they are addressed as "My Lord" or "My Lady". They are sometimes referred to as "purple judges" on account of their purple colour dress robes. Recorders effectively function as part-time circuit judges and are also addressed as "Your Honour".

Circuit judges rank below High Court judges but above district judges. They may be appointed to sit as deputy High Court judges, and some of the more senior circuit judges are eligible to sit in the Criminal Division of the Court of Appeal.

Formerly, circuit judges could only be drawn from barristers and solicitors of at least 10 years' standing. However, in 2004 there were calls for increased diversity among the judiciary that were recognised and the qualification period was changed so that, as of 21 July 2008, a potential circuit judge must satisfy the judicial-appointment eligibility condition on a 7-year basis.

== Circuits ==
Each circuit judge is assigned to a court circuit. There are six in England and Wales, namely the Midland, Northern, North Eastern, South Eastern and Western circuits, and the Wales and Chester circuit. Despite the name, Chester is a part of the Northern Circuit for administrative purposes.

== Court dress ==
When hearing criminal cases, circuit judges wear a violet robe with lilac trim, bands, a short horsehair wig and a red tippet (sash) over the left shoulder. For civil cases they wear the same robe with a lilac sash, but neither bands nor wigs are worn. When sitting at the Old Bailey, and for some types of High Court work, circuit judges wear a black silk gown over a court coat or a waistcoat. On ceremonial occasions they wear violet robes with a lilac trim and a full-bottomed wig.

== Senior and resident circuit judges ==
Some circuit judges are appointed as senior circuit judges and take on additional responsibility, such as the running of the largest court centres.

Some Crown Courts will appoint judges as 'resident judges', who will only hear cases at that court and act as the senior judge. This is often accompanied with an honorary recorder title.

== Literary references ==
In Rumpole and the Reign of Terror by John Mortimer, Horace Rumpole dismisses the idea of being a circuit judge: "Circus judge is what I call them."
