= Offences against military law in the United Kingdom =

The main offences against military law in the United Kingdom are set out in the Armed Forces Act 2006.

The offences fall into two main categories, discipline offences and criminal conduct offences. A second distinction is between those offences that can be dealt with by a commanding officer in a summary hearing, and those that can only be heard by the Court Martial.

== Discipline offences ==
Discipline offences are those offences that can only be committed by members of the armed forces or, in a few cases, by a civilian subject to service discipline.

The table below lists the principal discipline offences, and indicates for each offence:

- whether it can be committed by a civilian subject to military discipline as well as a service person
- whether a commanding officer can deal with the offence at a summary hearing (though if the defendant is a civilian subject to service discipline, it must be heard by the Service Civilian Court)
- the maximum sentence available to a Court Martial trying the offence. The maximum punishment that a Commanding Officer hearing a charge summarily can impose is generally 28 days in service detention, or up to 90 days with the authority of a Major General or equivalent.

Note: Rehabilitation of Offenders Act 1974 only applies to offences sentenced to imprisonment for 4 years or less.

Sec	Offence	Definition, example or notes	Civilian?	Summary hearing?	Maximum sentence at court martial
1	Assisting an enemy	Communicating without authority with an enemy; Giving an enemy information that would or might be useful to him; Providing an enemy with supplies; Harbouring or protecting an enemy; Serving with enemy forces or participating in propaganda having been taken prisoner	No	No	Life imprisonment
2	Misconduct on operations	Surrendering or abandoning a place or thing to the enemy without reasonable excuse; When in action or in the vicinity of the enemy: failing to use utmost exertions to carry out lawful orders; sleeping on duty, or leaving his post; spreading alarm or despondency within the ranks	No	No	Life imprisonment
3	Obstructing operations	Putting at risk, with intent or recklessness, the success of an action; Delaying or discouraging, without lawful excuse, an action	No	No	If in action with the enemy, life imprisonment. Otherwise, 10 years' imprisonment
4	Looting	Taking property, without lawful excuse, from a person killed, injured or captured in operations; Searching such a person with intent to take property; Taking, or searching a place for, property left exposed as a result of action	Yes	No	Life imprisonment
4	Looting	Taking a vehicle, equipment or stores abandoned by the enemy, unless for the public service	Yes	Yes	Seven years' imprisonment
5	Failing to escape	Failing to escape (when captured by an enemy, as a prisoner of war or otherwise) when there are reasonable steps that could be taken to escape; Preventing or discouraging, without lawful excuse, another from escaping	No	No	10 years' imprisonment
6	Mutiny	Attempting to overthrow or resist lawful authority; Disobeying lawful authority in order to subvert discipline; Conspiring to do the above	No	No	Life imprisonment
7	Failing to suppress mutiny	Failing to prevent or suppress a mutiny he knows is occurring or is intended	No	No	Life imprisonment
8	Desertion	Being absent without leave with the intention to remain so permanently	No	No	Two years' imprisonment
8	Desertion	Being absent without leave to avoid active service	No	No	Life imprisonment
9	Absence without leave	Intentionally or negligently being absent without leave; Recklessly doing an act that causes him to be absent without leave	No	Yes	Two years' imprisonment
10	Failing to apprehend deserters or absentees	Knowing that another is a deserter or absent without leave, failing to take reasonable steps to apprehend them	No	Yes	Two years' imprisonment
11	Misconduct towards a superior officer	Using violence against a superior officer; Threatening behaviour or communication to a superior officer	No	Yes	10 years' imprisonment
11	Misconduct towards a superior officer	Disrespectful behaviour or communication to a superior officer	No	Yes	Two years' imprisonment
12	Disobeying lawful commands	Intentionally or recklessly disobeying a lawful command	No	Yes	10 years' imprisonment
13	Contravening standing orders	Contravening a standing order he should be aware of	Yes	Yes	Two years' imprisonment
14	Using force against a sentry	Using force against a sentry; By threat of force, compelling a sentry to let him or another pass	No	Yes	Two years' imprisonment
15	Failing to attend for, or perform, duty	Without lawful excuse: failing to attend for duty; leaving a duty early; failing to perform a duty; Performing a duty negligently	No	Yes	Two years' imprisonment
16	Malingering	Pretending to have an injury or disease, or aggravating or prolonging an injury or disease, to avoid service	No	Yes	Two years' imprisonment
16	Malingering	Causing himself an injury, or causing another to injure him, to avoid service; Injuring another, or aggravating or prolonging the injury of another, to help him to avoid service	No	No	Two years' imprisonment
17	Disclosing information useful to an enemy	Disclosing information known or believed to be useful to an enemy, without lawful authority	No	Yes	Two years' imprisonment
18	Making false records	Making a false official record; Tampering with or suppressing an official document with intent to deceive; Failing to make an official record he has a duty to make, with intent to deceive	No	Yes	Two years' imprisonment
19	Conduct prejudicial to good order and discipline	e.g., Wearing a rank he is not entitled to	No	Yes	Two years' imprisonment
20	Unfitness or misconduct through alcohol or drugs	Due to the influence of alcohol or any intoxicant (unless given on medical advice or the orders of a superior officer): being unfit to be entrusted with a duty; behaving in a disorderly manner	No	Yes	Two years' imprisonment
21	Fighting or threatening behaviour	Fighting another without reasonable lawful excuse; Intentionally using threatening, abusive, insulting, or provocative behaviour likely to cause a disturbance	No	Yes	Two years' imprisonment
22	Ill-treating subordinates	Bullying, humiliating, degrading or using unnecessarily harsh behaviour against a subordinate	No	Yes	Two years' imprisonment
23	Disgraceful conduct of a cruel or indecent kind	Note: an act of a sexual nature that occurs in private between consenting adults is not generally regarded as indecent	No	Yes	Two years' imprisonment (They may also be placed on the Violent and Sex Offender Register for any period of time, even life)
24	Damage to, or loss of, public property	Intentionally, without lawful excuse, or recklessly damaging or causing the loss of public or military property, or properly belonging to another service person	No	Yes	10 years' imprisonment
24	Damage to, or loss of, public or service property	Negligently damaging or causing the loss of public or service property; Recklessly or negligently doing something likely to cause damage to, or the loss of, public or military property	No	Yes	Two years' imprisonment
25	Misapplying or wasting public or service property	e.g. Allowing fuel to overflow a tank	No	Yes	Dismissal with disgrace
27	Obstructing or failing to assist a service policeman	Obstructing a service policeman or provost officer; Failing, when called upon, to assist a service policeman or provost officer	Yes	Yes	Two years' imprisonment
28	Resisting arrest	Disobeying, using violence against or threatening a person ordering him into arrest	No	Yes	Two years' imprisonment
28	Resisting arrest	Using violence against, or threatening, a person arresting him	Yes	Yes	Two years' imprisonment
29	Service custody offences	Escaping from lawful custody; Using violence against, or threatening, a person having lawful custody	Yes	Yes	Two years' imprisonment
30	Allowing escape or unlawful release of prisoners	Intentionally or recklessly allowing a prisoner to escape; Knowingly releasing a prisoner without authority; Note: prisoner can be a service person, prisoner of war or other detainee	No	Yes	With intent or knowledge: ten years' imprisonment. Otherwise, two years' imprisonment
31	Hazarding a ship	Intentionally, without lawful excuse, or recklessly damaging, stranding or causing the loss of a military ship	No	No	Life imprisonment
31	Hazarding a ship	Negligently hazarding a military ship	No	No	Two years' imprisonment
32	Giving false air signals	Giving a false signal to aircraft; Interfering with signals for aircraft	No	No	Life imprisonment
33	Dangerous flying	Intentionally, without lawful excuse, or recklessly doing an act when flying, or in relation to, an aircraft that may or does cause injury or loss of life	No	No	Life imprisonment
33	Dangerous flying	Negligently doing an act when flying, or in relation to, an aircraft that may or does cause injury or loss of life	No	No	Two years' imprisonment
34	Low flying	Intentionally, recklessly or negligently flying below 2,000 feet (610 m) (fixed wing aircraft) or 500 feet (152 m) (helicopters)	No	Yes	Two years' imprisonment
35	Annoyance by flying	Flying an aircraft so as to annoy any person	No	Yes	Dismissal with disgrace
36	Inaccurate certification	Making or signing an inaccurate certificate relating to a ship, aircraft or specified equipment	No	Yes	Two years' imprisonment
37–38	Prize offences	Having captured a ship or aircraft: failing to send the ship's or aircraft's papers to a prize court; failing to bring the ship or aircraft (or cargo) to a port or airfield for adjudication by a prize court; ill-treating a person on board; unlawfully taking property from a person on board; interfering with the cargo (unless for service use)	No	No	Two years' imprisonment
305	Failing to provide a sample for drug testing	Relates to testing for illegal drugs	No	Yes	51 weeks' imprisonment
306	Failing to provide a sample for alcohol or drug testing	Relates to testing for alcohol or illegal drugs after a serious incident	Yes	Yes	51 weeks' imprisonment

== Criminal conduct offences ==
The military offence of criminal conduct covers anything done anywhere in the world that, if done in England and Wales, would be against the civilian criminal law.

A Commanding Officer can deal with some criminal conduct offences committed by a service person at a summary hearing, including:

- theft
- taking a vehicle without consent
- possession of a controlled drug
- criminal damage
- assault and battery
- careless driving
- drink driving
- dangerous or careless cycling

Some more serious offences can be dealt with summarily with the permission of a major general or equivalent:

- assault causing actual bodily harm
- possession of an offensive weapon in a public place
- fraud
- dishonestly obtaining services

Criminal conduct offences committed by a civilian subject to service discipline (such as a contractor or civil servant supporting operations) are dealt with by the Service Civilian Court if they could be tried by a magistrates' court in England and Wales.

More serious offences, whether committed by a service person or a civilian subject to service discipline, must be tried by the Court Martial.

The maximum punishment that can be imposed for criminal conduct is the same as could be imposed by the appropriate civilian court, the Magistrates' Court for minor offences, or the Crown Court for serious (indictable) offences.

== Punishments ==
The punishments that can be imposed on a convicted service person are:

- imprisonment (in a civilian prison). Offenders are automatically dismissed with disgrace.
- dismissal with disgrace
- dismissal
- detention in a military facility for two years or less (not officers). Offenders sentenced to detention are also automatically reduced in rank to an ordinary soldier, sailor or airman, and forfeit their pay for the period they are in detention.
- forfeiture of seniority (officers only)
- demotion by one rank (warrant officers or non-commissioned officers only)
- fine of up to 28 days' pay
- service community order (only used in conjunction with dismissal, with or without disgrace)
- reprimand or severe reprimand (officers, warrant officers and non-commissioned officers only). This will have an effect on future career prospects.
- service supervision and punishment order (ordinary soldiers, sailors, airmen only). This order, which may be in place for up to 90 days, includes forfeiture of one-sixth of pay and loss of leave, and may also include additional duties, and being prevented from using some facilities (e.g. leisure facilities).
- minor punishments:
  - loss of leave (non-commissioned officers and ordinary soldiers etc. only)
  - restriction of privileges (ordinary soldiers etc. only). This requires the offender to perform additional duties each day for up to 14 days.
  - admonition (ordinary soldiers etc. only). This is recorded on the offenders' service record.
- service compensation order. Requires the payment of compensation for personal injury or damage to property. Amounts of likely compensation payable range from £50 for a graze or severe bruise, to £3,000 for a fractured limb.
- being placed on the Violent and Sex Offender Register for any period, including life.

A civilian convicted by a military court may be sentenced to one of the following punishments:

- imprisonment (in a civilian prison)
- fine
- service community order
- overseas community order
- conditional or absolute discharge
- service compensation order
- being placed on the Violent and Sex Offender Register for any period, including indefinitely

== See also ==
- Military courts of the United Kingdom
- Civilian subject to service discipline
- AGAI 67
