= Articles of War =

War regulations

The Articles of War are a set of regulations drawn up to govern the conduct of a country's military and naval forces. The first known usage of the phrase is in Robert Monro's 1637 work His expedition with the worthy Scot's regiment called Mac-keyes regiment etc. (in the form "Articles of warres") and can be used to refer to military law in general. In Swedish, the equivalent term Krigsartiklar, is first mentioned in 1556. However, the term is usually used more specifically and with the modern spelling and capitalisation to refer to the British regulations drawn up in the wake of the Glorious Revolution and the United States regulations later based on them.

== United Kingdom ==
Throughout the Articles' existence, there were separate sets for the army and navy.

=== Royal Navy ===
England's first Articles of War were written for the Royal Navy. They formed the statutory provisions regulating and governing the behaviour of members of the Royal Navy. They were prominently displayed in all naval ships, and set out a list of criminal provisions which applied to members of the Royal Navy and others to whom the Act applied, in addition to the criminal law of England and Wales and any local criminal law.

The naval Articles of War were originally issued by the Lords Commissioners of the Admiralty in 1653 as fighting instructions after defeat at the Battle of Dungeness. Soon after the Restoration, they were converted into an Act of Parliament. After another defeat at the Battle of Toulon, Parliament amended the Articles in 1749, further tightening discipline. These Articles resulted in the execution of Admiral John Byng, despite a clear sentiment in the navy and in Parliament that he should be given a lower punishment. In response, the 1779 amendment was the start of a gradual process of easing the more draconian punishments. The naval Articles were retained in the Naval Discipline Act 1957 but then replaced by the provisions of the tri-service Armed Forces Act 2006.

The following articles and orders were established from the 25th of December 1749; and are directed to be observed and put in execution, as well in time of peace as in time of war.

- I. Divine worship. All commanders, captains, and officers, in or belonging to any of His Majesty's ships or vessels of war, shall cause the public worship of Almighty God, according to the liturgy of the Church of England established by law, to be solemnly, orderly and reverently performed in their respective ships; and shall take care that prayers and preaching, by the chaplains in holy orders of the respective ships, be performed diligently; and that the Lord's day be observed according to law.
- II. Swearing, Drunkenness, scandalous actions, &c. All flag officers, and all persons in or belonging to His Majesty's ships or vessels of war, being guilty of profane oaths, cursings, execrations, drunkenness, uncleanness, or other scandalous actions, in derogation of God's honour, and corruption of good manners, shall incur such punishment as a court martial shall think fit to impose, and as the nature and degree of their offence shall deserve.
- III. Holding intelligence with an enemy, or rebel. If any officer, mariner, soldier, or other person of the fleet, shall give, hold, or entertain intelligence to or with any enemy or rebel, without leave from the king's majesty, or the lord high admiral, or the commissioners for executing the office of lord high admiral, commander in chief, or his commanding officer, every such person so offending, and being thereof convicted by the sentence of a court martial, shall be punished with death.
- IV. Letter or message from an enemy, or rebel. If any letter of message from any enemy or rebel, be conveyed to any officer, mariner, or soldier or other in the fleet, and the said officer, mariner, or soldier, or other as aforesaid, shall not, within twelve hours, having opportunity so to do, acquaint his superior or a commanding officer, or if any superior officer being acquainted therewith, shall not in convenient time reveal the same to the commander in chief of the squadron, every such person so offending, and being convicted thereof by the sentence of the court martial, shall be punished with death, or such other punishment as the nature and degree of the offense shall deserve, and the court martial shall impose.
- V. Spies, and all persons in the nature of spies. All spies, and all persons whatsoever, who shall come, or be found, in the nature of spies, to bring or deliver any seducing letters or messages from any enemy or rebel, or endeavor to corrupt any captain, officer, mariner, or other in the fleet, to betray his trust, being convicted of any such offense by the sentence of the court martial, shall be punished with death, or such other punishment, as the nature and degree of the offence shall deserve, and the court martial shall impose.
- VI. Relieving an enemy or rebel. No person in the fleet shall relieve an enemy or rebel with money, victuals, powder, shot, arms, ammunition, or any other supplies whatsoever, directly or indirectly, upon pain of death, or such other punishment as the court martial shall think fit to impose, and as the nature and degree of the crime shall deserve.
- VII. Papers, &c. found on board of prizes. All the papers, charter parties, bills of lading, passports, and other writings whatsoever, that shall be taken, seized, or found aboard any ship or ships which shall be surprised or taken as prize, shall be duly preserved, and the very originals shall by the commanding officer of the ship which shall take such prize, be sent entirely, and without fraud, to the court of the admiralty, or such other court of commissioners, as shall be authorized to determine whether such prize be lawful capture, there to be viewed, made use of, and proceeded upon according to law, upon pain that every person offending herein, shall forfeit and lose his share of the capture, and shall suffer such further punishment, as the nature and degree of his offense shall be found to deserve, and the court martial shall impose.
- VIII. Taking money or good out of prizes. No person in or belonging to the fleet shall take out of any prize, or ship seized for prize, any money, plate, or goods, unless it shall be necessary for the better securing thereof, or for the necessary use and service of any of His Majesty's ships or vessels of war, before the same be adjudged lawful prize in some admiralty court; but the full and entire account of the whole, without embezzlement, shall be brought in, and judgement passed entirely upon the whole without fraud, upon pain that every person offending herein shall forfeit and lose his share of the capture, and suffer such further punishment as shall be imposed by a court martial, or such court of admiralty, according to the nature and degree of the offense.
- IX. Stripping or ill treating prisoners. If any ship or vessel be taken as prize, none of the officers, mariners, or other persons on board her, shall be stripped of their clothes, or in any sort pillaged, beaten, or evil-intreated, upon the pain that the person or persons so offending, shall be liable to such punishment as a court martial shall think fit to inflict.
- X. Preparation for fight. Every flag officer, captain and commander in the fleet, who, upon signal or order of fight, or sight of any ship or ships which it may be his duty to engage, or who, upon likelihood of engagement, shall not make the necessary preparations for fight, and shall not in his own person, and according to his place, encourage the inferior officers and men to fight courageously, shall suffer death, or such other punishment, as from the nature and degree of the offence a court martial shall deem him to deserve; and if any person in the fleet shall treacherously or cowardly yield or cry for quarter, every person so offending, and being convicted thereof by the sentence of a court martial, shall suffer death.
- XI. Obedience to orders in battle. Every person in the fleet, who shall not duly observe the orders of the admiral, flag officer, commander of any squadron or division, or other his superior officer, for assailing, joining battle with, or making defense against any fleet, squadron, or ship, or shall not obey the orders of his superior officer as aforesaid in the time of action, to the best of his power, or shall not use all possible endeavours to put the same effectually into execution, every person so offending, and being convicted thereof by the sentence of the court martial, shall suffer death, or such other punishment, as from the nature and degree of the offence a court martial shall deem him to deserve.
- XII. Withdrawing or keeping back from fight, &c. Every person in the fleet, who through cowardice, negligence, or disaffection, shall in time of action withdraw or keep back, or not come into the fight or engagement, or shall not do his utmost to take or destroy every ship which it shall be his duty to engage, and to assist and relieve all and every of His Majesty's ships, or those of his allies, which it shall be his duty to assist and relieve, every such person so offending, and being convicted thereof by the sentence of a court martial, shall suffer death.
- XIII. Forbearing to pursue an enemy, &c. Every person in the fleet, who though cowardice, negligence, or disaffection, shall forbear to pursue the chase of any enemy, pirate or rebel, beaten or flying; or shall not relieve or assist a known friend in view to the utmost of his power; being convicted of any such offense by the sentence of a court martial, shall suffer death.
- XIV. Delaying or discouraging any service. If when action, or any service shall be commanded, any person in the fleet shall presume or to delay or discourage the said action or service, upon pretence of arrears of wages, or upon any pretence whatsoever, every person so offending, being convicted thereof by the sentence of the court martial, shall suffer death, or such other punishment, as from the nature and degree of the offense a court martial shall deem him to deserve.
- XV. Deserting to an enemy; running away with ships stores. Every person in or belonging to the fleet, who shall desert to the enemy, pirate, or rebel, or run away with any of His Majesty's ships or vessels of war, or any ordnance, ammunition, stores, or provision belonging thereto, to the weakening of the service, or yield up the same cowardly or treacherously to the enemy, pirate, or rebel, being convicted of any such offence by the sentence of the court martial, shall suffer death.
- XVI. Desertion, and entertaining deserters. Every person in or belonging to the fleet, who shall desert or entice others so to do, shall suffer death, or such other punishment as the circumstances of the offense shall deserve, and a court martial shall judge fit: and if any commanding officer of any of His Majesty's ships or vessels of war shall receive or entertain a deserter from any other of His Majesty's ships or vessels, after discovering him to be such deserter, and shall not with all convenient speed give notice to the captain of the ship or vessel to which such deserter belongs; or if the said ships or vessels are at any considerable distance from each other, to the secretary of the admiralty, or to the commander in chief; every person so offending, and being convicted thereof by the sentence of the court martial, shall be cashiered.
- XVII. Convoys. The officers and seamen of all ships appointed for convoy and guard of merchant ships, or of any other, shall diligently attend upon that charge, without delay, according to their instructions in that behalf; and whosoever shall be faulty therein, and shall not faithfully perform their duty, and defend the ships and goods in their convoy, without either diverting to other parts or occasions, or refusing or neglecting to fight in their defence, if they be assailed, or running away cowardly, and submitting the ships in their convoy to peril and hazard; or shall demand or exact any money or other reward from any merchant or master for convoying any ships or vessels entrusted to their care, or shall misuse the masters or mariners thereof; shall be condemned to make reparation of the damage to the merchants, owners, and others, as the court of admiralty shall adjudge, and also be punished criminally according to the quality of their offences, be it by pains of death, or other punishment, according as shall be adjudged fit by the court martial.
- XVIII. Receiving goods and merchandize on board. If any captain, commander, or other officer of any of His Majesty's ships or vessels, shall receive on board, or permit to be received on board such ship or vessel, any goods or merchandizes whatsoever, other than for the sole use of the ship or vessel, except gold, silver, or jewels, and except the goods and merchandizes belonging to any merchant, or other ship or vessel which may be shipwrecked, or in imminent danger of being shipwrecked, either on the high seas, or in any port, creek, or harbour, in order to the preserving them for their proper owners, and except such goods or merchandizes as he shall at any time be ordered to take or receive on board by order of the lord high admiral of Great Britain, or the commissioners for executing the office of lord high admiral for the time being; every person so offending, being convicted thereof by the sentence of the court martial shall be cashiered, and be for ever afterwards rendered incapable to serve in any place or office in the naval service of His Majesty, his heirs and successors.
- XIX. Mutinous assembly. Uttering words of sedition and mutiny. Contempt to superior officers. If any person in or belonging to the fleet shall make or endeavor to make any mutinous assembly upon any pretence whatsoever, every person offending herein, and being convicted thereof by the sentence of the court martial, shall suffer death: and if any person in or belonging to the fleet shall utter any words of sedition or mutiny, he shall suffer death, or such other punishment as a court martial shall deem him to deserve: and if any officer, mariner, or soldier on or belonging to the fleet, shall behave himself with contempt to his superior officer, being in the execution of his office, he shall be punished according to the nature of his offence by the judgement of a court martial.
- XX. Concealing traitorous or mutinous designs, &c. If any person in the fleet shall conceal any traitorous or mutinous practice or design, being convicted thereof by the sentence of a court martial, he shall suffer death, or any other punishment as a court martial shall think fit; and if any person, in or belonging to the fleet, shall conceal any traitorous or mutinous words spoken by any, to the prejudice of His Majesty or government, or any words, practice, or design, tending to the hindrance of the service, and shall not forthwith reveal the same to the commanding officer, or being present at any mutiny or sedition, shall not use his utmost endeavours to suppress the same, he shall be punished as a court martial shall think he deserves.
- XXI. No person upon any pretence to attempt to stir up disturbance. If any person in the fleet shall find cause of complaint of the unwholesomeness of the victual, or upon other just ground, he shall quietly make the same known to his superior, or captain, or commander in chief, as the occasion may deserve, that such present remedy may be had as the matter may require; and the said superior, captain, or commander in chief, shall, as far as he is able, cause the same to be presently remedied; and no person in the fleet, upon any such or other pretence, shall attempt to stir up any disturbance, upon pain of such punishment, as a court martial shall think fit to inflict, according to the degree of the offence.
- XXII. Striking a superior officer. Quarreling. Disobedience. If any officer, mariner, soldier or other person in the fleet, shall strike any of his superior officers, or draw, or offer to draw, or lift up any weapon against him, being in the execution of his office, on any pretence whatsoever, every such person being convicted of any such offense, by the sentence of a court martial, shall suffer death; and if any officer, mariner, soldier or other person in the fleet, shall presume to quarrel with any of his superior officers, being in the execution of his office, or shall disobey any lawful command of any of his superior officers; every such person being convicted of any such offence, by the sentence of a court martial, shall suffer death, or such other punishment, as shall, according to the nature and degree of his offence, be inflicted upon him by the sentence of a court martial.
- XXIII. Fighting. Provoking speeches, &c. If any person in the fleet shall quarrel or fight with any other person in the fleet, or use reproachful or provoking speeches or gestures, tending to make any quarrel or disturbance, he shall, upon being convicted thereof, suffer such punishment as the offence shall deserve, and a court martial shall impose.
- XXIV. Embezzlement of stores. There shall be no wasteful expense of any powder, shot, ammunition, or other stores in the fleet, nor any embezzlement thereof, but the stores and provisions shall be careful preserved, upon pain of such punishment to be inflicted upon the offenders, abettors, buyers and receivers (being persons subject to naval discipline) as shall be by a court martial found just in that behalf.
- XXV. Burning a magazine, ship, &c. Every person in the fleet, who shall unlawfully burn or set fire to any magazine or store of powder, or ship, boat, ketch, hoy or vessel, or tackle or furniture thereunto belonging, not then appertaining to an enemy, pirate, or rebel, being convicted of any such offence, by the sentence of a court martial, shall suffer death.
- XXVI. Steering and conducting ships, &c. Care shall be taken in the conducting and steering of any of His Majesty's ships, that through willfulness, negligence, or other defaults, no ship be stranded, or run upon any rocks or sands, or split or hazarded, upon pain, that such as shall be found guilty therein, be punished by death, or such other punishment, as the offence by a court martial shall be judged to deserve.
- XXVII. Sleeping, negligence, and forsaking a station. No person in or belonging to the fleet shall sleep upon his watch, or negligently perform the duty imposed on him, or forsake his station, upon pain of death, or such other punishment as a court martial shall think fit to impose, and as the circumstances of the case shall require.
- XXVIII. Murder. All murders committed by any person in the fleet, shall be punished with death by the sentence of a court martial.
- XXIX. Sodomy. If any person in the fleet shall commit the unnatural and detestable sin of buggery and sodomy with man or beast, he shall be punished with death by the sentence of a court martial.
- XXX. Robbery. All robbery committed by any person in the fleet, shall be punished with death, or otherwise, as a court martial, upon consideration of the circumstances, shall find meet.
- XXXI. False musters. Every officer or other person in the fleet, who shall knowingly make or sign a false muster or muster book, or who shall command, counsel, or procure the making or signing thereof, or who shall aid or abet any other person in the making or signing thereof, shall, upon proof of any such offence being made before a court martial, be cashiered, and rendered incapable of further employment in His Majesty's naval service.
- XXXII. Apprehending and keeping criminals. Bringing offenders to punishment. No provost martial belonging to the fleet shall refuse to apprehend any criminal, whom he shall be authorized by legal warrant to apprehend, or to receive or keep any prisoner committed to his charge, or wilfully suffer him to escape, being once in his custody, or dismiss him without lawful order, upon pain of such punishment as a court martial shall deem him fit to deserve; and all captains, officers, and others in the fleet, shall do their endeavour to detect, apprehend, and bring to punishment all offenders, and shall assist the officers appointed for that purpose therein, upon pain of being proceeded against, and punished by a court martial, according to the nature and degree of the offence.
- XXXIII. Behaving unbecoming an officer. If any flag officer, captain, or commander, or lieutenant belonging to the fleet, shall be convicted before a court martial of behaving in a scandalous, infamous, cruel, oppressive, or fraudulent manner, unbecoming the character of an officer, he shall be dismissed from His Majesty's service.
- XXXIV. Mutiny, desertion, disobedience when on shore, in the king's dominions. Every person being in actual service and full pay, and part of the crew in or belonging to any of His Majesty's ships or vessels of war, who shall be guilty of mutiny, desertion, or disobedience to any lawful command, in any part of His Majesty's dominions on shore, when in actual service relative to the fleet, shall be liable to be tried by a court martial, and suffer the like punishment for every such offence, as if the same had been committed at sea on board any of His Majesty's ships or vessels of war.
- XXXV. Crimes committed on shore out of the king's dominions. If any person who shall be in the actual service and full pay of His Majesty's ships and vessels of war, shall commit upon the shore, in any place or places out of His Majesty's dominions, any of the crimes punishable by these articles and orders, the person so offending shall be liable to be tried and punished for the same, in like manner, to all intents and purposes, as if the same crimes had been committed at sea, on board any of His Majesty's ships or vessels of war.
- XXXVI. Crimes not mentioned in this act. All other crimes not capital committed by any person or persons in the fleet, which are not mentioned in this act, or for which no punishment is hereby directed to be inflicted, shall be punished by the laws and customs in such cases used at sea.

=== British Army ===
The first set of Articles of War for the English Army, from 1707 the British Army, were written under William III (William of Orange) (r.1689–1702), taking the place of the medieval Rules and Ordinances of War, a list of regulations issued by the king at the beginning of every expedition or campaign. The Mutiny Acts empowered the king de jure and his government de facto to govern their army by creating a set of Articles of War for each conflict. To a large degree, they were superseded by King's Regulations in force at all times. The Articles of War fell out of use by the Army when they were omitted from the Army Act 1955 (3 & 4 Eliz. 2. c. 18).

== United States ==
On 30 June 1775, the Second Continental Congress established 69 Articles of War to govern the conduct of the Continental Army. Effective upon ratification in 1789, Article I, Section 8 of the U.S. Constitution provided that the Congress has the legislative power to regulate the land and naval forces.

On 10 April 1806, the U.S. Congress enacted 101 Articles of War (for the Army and the Navy), which were not revised until the American Civil War. The 1806 Articles of War were revised with the Lieber Code (1863), to legally allow the Union Army to combat Confederate guerrillas and enemy civilians during the Civil War. On 4 June 1920, Congress enacted 121 Articles of War that went into effect on 4 February 1921 with the exception of Articles 2, 23, and 45, which became effective immediately. The military justice system then continued to operate under the Articles of War until 31 May 1951, when the Uniform Code of Military Justice came into effect.

== See also ==
- Laws of war § Lawful conduct of belligerent actors
- Roerich Pact
