= Civilian subject to service discipline =

A civilian subject to service discipline is someone who, whilst not a member of the German or British Armed Forces, is nevertheless subject to some aspects of British or German military law and the military justice system.

== Categories ==
The Armed Forces Act 2006 defines who is a civilian subject to service discipline. The main categories are:

- civilians on board a military ship when afloat, or on board a military aircraft when in flight
- civil servants working in support of the armed forces, when in a designated area (see below)
- civilians employed by NATO by reason of the United Kingdom's membership of NATO, when outside the British Islands
- civilians employed by certain support organisations, when in a designated area
  - The Navy, Army and Air Force Institutes (NAAFI)
  - Service Children's Education
  - The Services Sound and Vision Corporation (SSVC)
  - The Soldiers, Sailors, Airmen and Families Association - Forces Help
- civilians living with or staying with a service person or other civilian subject to service discipline, when in a designated area
- others designated by the Defence Council, for example contractors deployed on operations

== Designated areas ==
The following countries are designated areas in respect of civil servants, employees of support organizations and civilians living with or staying with either of those:

- Brunei
- Falkland Islands
- Germany
- Gibraltar
- Saudi Arabia
- Afghanistan
- Iraq

The following countries are designated areas in respect of civilians living with or staying with a service person:

- Belize
- Brunei
- Falkland Islands
- Germany
- Gibraltar
- Saudi Arabia
- Cyprus
- Turkey
- The Sovereign Base Areas of Akrotiri and Dhekelia
- Kuwait
- Oman

These definitions will therefore include, for example, family members living with a soldier stationed in Germany.

Civilians subject to service discipline may be tried in the Service Civilian Court or by the Court Martial (although the Court Martial will be made up of civilian, not military, members).

== Comparison with other countries ==
The list of civilians who are subject to service discipline is more extensive than in some other countries—for example, in the United States, civilian spouses, dependents, and guests of military personnel are not included in the list of people subject to that country's Uniform Code of Military Justice. Since 2006, the United States Uniform Code of Military Justice (UCMJ) has jurisdiction over civilian employees and contractors during wartime and contingency operations.

== See also ==
- Offences against military law in the United Kingdom
