= Military courtesy =

Strict code of conduct in a military force

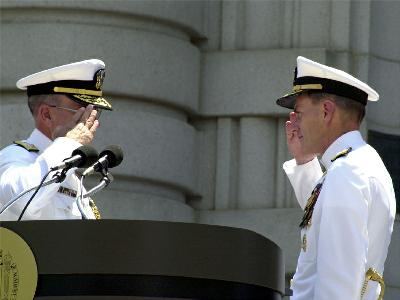
Admirals Jay L. Johnson and Vern Clark of the United States Navy salute each other during a change of command ceremony. Clark is relieving Johnson as Chief of Naval Operations.

Military courtesy is one of the defining features of a military force. The courtesies form a strict and sometimes elaborate code of conduct. It is an extension and a formalization of courtesies practiced in a culture's everyday life. It is intended to reinforce military discipline and the chain of command by defining how soldiers will treat their superiors and vice versa. They are also thought to enhance esprit de corps.

Some military courtesies include proper forms of address ("Sir", "Ma'am", "Mister") and when each should be used; the salute and the related concept of standing at attention; proper wear of military headgear; obeisance; and the rules for behavior in various ceremonies. Specifics can vary depending on an individual's rank, location, and circumstances. A military funeral, for example, requires stricter etiquette than on a normal day. Courtesies are sometimes relaxed under battlefield conditions; officers may discourage salutes in combat areas to avoid making themselves a target for snipers. In the United States of America as well as some Commonwealth nations, it is forbidden to salute both indoors and in "the field," as snipers are likely to pick out officer targets watching for salutes.

There are military customs that have specific purposes. In the United States Navy, "bracing" is the practice of bracing one's self against the bulkhead (wall) at the position of attention as a superior officer walks by. The practice arose because of the narrow passageways on ships. Since officers may need to quickly move about the ship, sailors would get out of the officer's way by bracing. The tradition has extended to include the corridors and hallways of buildings (depending on the situation), and it is mostly an obeisance, but it still serves a useful purpose aboard ships (especially submarines).

According to Field Manual 7-21.13 4-4:

"Courtesy among members of the Armed Forces is vital to maintain military discipline. Military courtesy means good manners and politeness in dealing with other people. Courteous behavior provides a basis for developing good human relations. The distinction between civilian and military courtesy is that military courtesy was developed in a military atmosphere and has become an integral part of serving in uniform."

Military courtesy has been established, over the years, to establish and maintain order and structure that is the backbone of the military.

Military courtesies may also be adopted by paramilitary organizations.

== See also ==
- Military discipline
- Military uniform
  - Full dress uniform
  - Mess dress uniform
  - Service dress uniform
  - Combat uniform
- Salute
- Sideboy
