= Armed Forces Act 2006 =

Act of the Parliament of the United Kingdom

Armed Forces Act 2006 (Note: Section 386.)
- Act of Parliament
- Parliament of the United Kingdom
- Long title: An Act to make provision with respect to the armed forces; and for connected purposes.
- Citation: 2006 c. 52
- Territorial extent: United Kingdom

Dates
- Royal assent: 8 November 2006
- Commencement: 8 November 2006 (Note: Section 383(1).); 31 October 2009 (Note: The Armed Forces Act 2006 (Commencement No. 5) Order 2009 (SI 2009/1167).)
Other legislation
Amends	Act of Settlement 1701; Metropolitan Police Act 1860; Regimental Debts Act 1893; Homicide Act 1957; Jamaica Independence Act 1962; Trinidad and Tobago Independence Act 1962; Malaysia Act 1963; Malawi Independence Act 1964; Zambia Independence Act 1964; Malta Independence Act 1964; Gambia Independence Act 1964; Singapore Act 1966; Barbados Independence Act 1966; Criminal Law Act 1967; Courts-Martial (Appeals) Act 1968; Criminal Justice Act 1972; Juries Act 1974; House of Commons Disqualification Act 1975; Fatal Accidents and Sudden Deaths Inquiry (Scotland) Act 1976; Bail Act 1976; Oaths Act 1978; Judicature (Northern Ireland) Act 1978; Magistrates' Courts Act 1980; Public Passenger Vehicles Act 1981; Belize Act 1981; Armed Forces Act 1981; Inheritance Tax Act 1984; Debtors (Scotland) Act 1987; Criminal Justice Act 1988; Courts and Legal Services Act 1990; Sexual Offences (Amendment) Act 1992; Judicial Pensions and Retirement Act 1993; Goods Vehicles (Licensing of Operators) Act 1995; Criminal Procedure (Scotland) Act 1995; Reserve Forces Act 1996; Human Rights Act 1998; Youth Justice and Criminal Evidence Act 1999; Criminal Justice and Court Services Act 2000; International Criminal Court Act 2001; Anti-terrorism, Crime and Security Act 2001; Crime (International Co-operation) Act 2003; Domestic Violence, Crime and Victims Act 2004; Human Tissue Act 2004; Constitutional Reform Act 2005
Repeals/revokes	Colonial Naval Defence Act 1931; Naval Forces (Enforcement of Maintenance Liabilities) Act 1947; Army and Air Force (Women's Service) Act 1948; Colonial Naval Defence Act 1949; Army Act 1955; Air Force Act 1955; Ghana Independence Act 1957; Naval Discipline Act 1957; Army and Air Force Act 1961; Armed Forces Act 1966; Armed Forces Act 1986; Army Act 1992; Armed Forces Discipline Act 2000
Amended by	Serious Crime Act 2007; Criminal Justice and Immigration Act 2008; Coroners and Justice Act 2009; Armed Forces Act 2011; Domestic Violence, Crime and Victims (Amendment) Act 2012; Legal Aid, Sentencing and Punishment of Offenders Act 2012; Criminal Justice and Courts Act 2015; Armed Forces (Service Complaints and Financial Assistance) Act 2015; Armed Forces Act 2016; Investigatory Powers Act 2016; Inquiries into Fatal Accidents and Sudden Deaths etc. (Scotland) Act 2016; Armed Forces (Flexible Working) Act 2018; Space Industry Act 2018; Offensive Weapons Act 2019; Sentencing (Pre-consolidation Amendments) Act 2020; Sentencing Act 2020; Overseas Operations (Service Personnel and Veterans) Act 2021; Armed Forces Act 2021; Elections Act 2022; National Security Act 2023; Veterans Advisory and Pensions Committees Act 2023; Automated Vehicles Act 2024; Sentencing Act 2026; Victims and Courts Act 2026; National Security (State Threats) Act 2026

Status: Amended

History of passage through Parliament

Text of statute as originally enacted

Revised text of statute as amended

The Armed Forces Act 2006 (c. 52) is an act of the Parliament of the United Kingdom.

It came into force on 31 October 2009. It replaces the three separate Service Discipline Acts (the Army Act 1955 (3 & 4 Eliz. 2. c. 18), the Air Force Act 1955 (3 & 4 Eliz. 2. c. 19) and the Naval Discipline Act 1957 (5 & 6 Eliz. 2. c. 53)) as the system of military justice under which the British Armed Forces operate. The act harmonises service law across the three armed services. One motivating factor behind the changes in the legislation combining discipline acts across the armed forces is the trend towards tri-service operations and defence organizations.

The act allowed for the expansion of the service justice system into dealing with serious offences such as murder, manslaughter and rape. The act also granted a symbolic pardon to soldiers controversially executed for cowardice and other offences during World War I.

== Key changes ==
Key areas of change include:

- Summary discipline: Summary hearing and the role of the commanding officer is retained at the heart of Service discipline and is the mechanism by which most offences are dealt. Summary offences and powers are harmonised across the Services. There is a reduction in the number of offences and sentencing powers available to Commanding Officers of the Royal Navy and an increase in those available to British Army and Royal Air Force Commanding Officers as powers of punishment are harmonised.
- Service Prosecuting Authority: A single Service Prosecuting Authority, staffed by lawyers from all three Services, has been created. The role of the SPA is unchanged in that it will determine whether to prosecute an accused under Service law and will conduct the prosecution case at most Courts Martial.
- The Court Martial: Courts Martial remain the means of dealing with the most serious offences. A standing Court Martial has been introduced comprising a Judge Advocate and a minimum of 3 or 5 Service members depending on the seriousness of the offence. In order to harmonise with the other Services, the Royal Navy introduced the unqualified right for all personnel to elect for trial by Court Martial regardless of the seriousness of the offence.

== Offences ==
The act sets out offences against service law and the associated punishments. The offences fall into two main categories:

- discipline offences, which can only be committed by members of the armed forces or, in a few cases, by a civilian subject to service discipline
- criminal conduct offences, which are acts done anywhere in the world which, if done in England and Wales, would be against the civilian criminal law.

== Pardon ==
The mass pardon of 306 British Empire soldiers executed for certain offences during the World War I was enacted in Section 359 of the Act, which came into effect on royal assent. This number included three from New Zealand, 23 from Canada, two from the West Indies, two from Ghana and one each from Sierra Leone, Egypt and Nigeria.

Tom Watson, then Parliamentary Under-Secretary of State at the Ministry of Defence, was instrumental in including this in the Act. He was said to have acted having met the relatives of Private Harry Farr, who was executed despite strong evidence that he was suffering from PTSD.

However, section 359(4) states that the pardon "does not affect any conviction or sentence." Since the nature of a pardon is normally to commute a sentence, Gerald Howarth MP asked during parliamentary debate: "we are entitled to ask what it does do." It would appear to be a symbolic pardon only, and some members of Parliament had called for the convictions to be quashed, although the pardon has still been welcomed by relatives of executed soldiers.

== Commencements ==
The following orders have been made under section 383(2):

- The Armed Forces Act 2006 (Commencement No. 1) Order 2007 (S.I. 2007/1442 (C. 60))
- The Armed Forces Act 2006 (Commencement No. 2) Order 2007 (S.I. 2007/2913 (C. 115))
- The Armed Forces Act 2006 (Commencement No. 3) Order 2008 (S.I. 2008/1650 (C. 72))
- The Armed Forces Act 2006 (Commencement No. 4) Order 2009 (S.I. 2009/812 (C. 54))
- The Armed Forces Act 2006 (Commencement No. 5) Order 2009 (S.I. 2009/167 (C. 64))

== See also ==
- Armed Forces Act
- Military courts of the United Kingdom
- Pardon for Soldiers of the Great War Act 2000
