= Hillingdon House =

Mansion in Hillingdon, Greater London

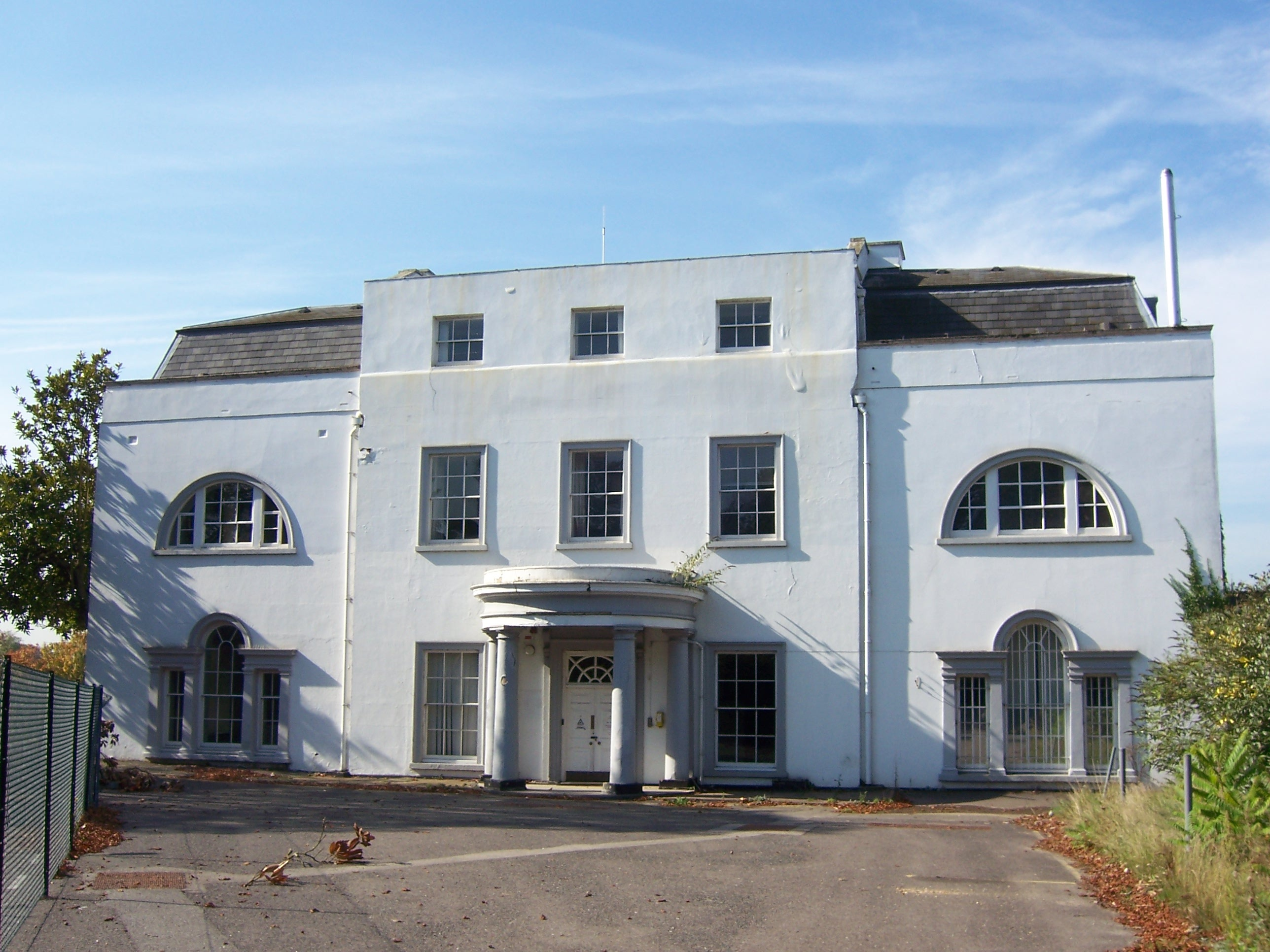
- Front of Hillingdon House, pictured in 2012

- Location within London Borough of Hillingdon

General information
- Architectural style: Victorian
- Location: Uxbridge, Greater London, England
- Coordinates: 51.542819°N 0.465278°W
- Completed: 1717; Destroyed by fire - rebuilt 1844

Design and construction
- Architect: George Mair (1844 rebuild)

Hillingdon House is a Grade II listed mansion in Hillingdon, Greater London. The original house was built in 1717 as a hunting lodge for the Duke of Schomberg. It was destroyed by fire and the present house was built in its place in 1844.

The British Government purchased Hillingdon House in 1915 and it became a military hospital. In 1917, what would become the Royal Air Force station RAF Uxbridge was established within the grounds. In military use, the house has served over time as the first headquarters for No. 11 Group RAF and RAF Bomber Command. The River Pinn passes through the grounds of the house from north to south, splitting the former RAF Uxbridge in two.

The Hillingdon House Farm estate to the north of the house includes the Hillingdon Sports and Leisure Complex (formerly Uxbridge Lido). The farm ceased operations in 1965 after the local council served a notice to quit on the tenant. The farmhouse on Honeycroft Hill became a council depot, followed by a plant nursery, before it was sold for residential housing.

Under plans approved in early 2011 for the redevelopment of the RAF station, the house will be renovated and converted to include a restaurant. As of 2014 it is not accessible to the public while the site undergoes redevelopment.

== History ==
=== First house ===
The first house on the site was built as a hunting lodge in 1717 for the Duke of Schomberg, a British army commander of German origin. He is said to have been very argumentative, to the point where he would argue with all those around him bar the enemy.

The house eventually passed to the Chetwynd family, who sold it to the Mary Watson-Wentworth, Marchioness of Rockingham, widow of the Prime Minister Charles Watson-Wentworth, 2nd Marquess of Rockingham, in 1786 for £9,000. The Marchioness lived there until her own death in 1804, upon which the estate passed to her stepsister Elizabeth, widow of William Weddell MP. Her husband had left her Newby Hall in Mayfair, therefore having no need of Hillingdon House, she sold it to Josias Du Pré Porcher in 1805. In 1810 the estate was sold to Richard Henry Cox, a member of the Cox banking family and the grandson of Richard Cox, founder of the travel company Cox & Kings.

=== Second house ===
Hillingdon House, c. 1900

After the first house burnt down, the present structure was built in 1844, in a classical Victorian style. In 1892, an area of the estate south of the house was established as Hillingdon Golf Club, founded by Charles Newton who lived at Hillingdon House, and Charles Stevens, a partner of a local timber company. The estate of Frederick Cox, Richard Henry Cox's grandson, placed the house on the market in 1914, describing it as "a brick and stone building, partly stuccoed, with extensive outbuildings and ornamental gardens." The house and gardens, together with the surrounding parkland and artificial lake created by damming a section of the River Pinn, amounted to more 200 acres (81 ha).

The British Government bought the house and grounds in 1915, intending to construct a prisoner of war camp within the grounds. Local opposition to the plan led to the house becoming the Canadian Convalescent Hospital to care for troops evacuated from the front line during the First World War. The hospital opened on 20 September 1915 and closed on 12 December 1917, having had four commanding officers and five sisters-in-charge.

On 19 November 1917, 114 officers and 1156 men of the Royal Flying Corps (RFC) Armament School moved into Hillingdon House, with the RFC making a donation of £2289 12s 9d to the Canadian Red Cross. Needing a site for the training of recruits in ground gunnery, the RFC used parts of the estate not required by the Canadian hospital and established a firing range on the opposite side of the river from the house.

When the Royal Air Force was formed on 1 April 1918, following the merger of the Royal Flying Corps and the Royal Naval Air Service, the Uxbridge site came under the control of the new service, becoming known as the RAF Central Depot, Uxbridge. The site was then split to form administratively two RAF stations: the area east of the River Pinn including Hillingdon House became RAF Hillingdon and the remainder RAF Uxbridge. Among the aircraftmen trained at Hillingdon was T. E. Lawrence ('Lawrence of Arabia'), whose book The Mint, initially censored for its frank use of four-letter words, describes his time there: "Hillingdon House looked forlorn, because of its black windows, behind whose wideness the clerks lounged with their first cups of tea. 'Jammy [cunts],' sneered Sailor enviously."

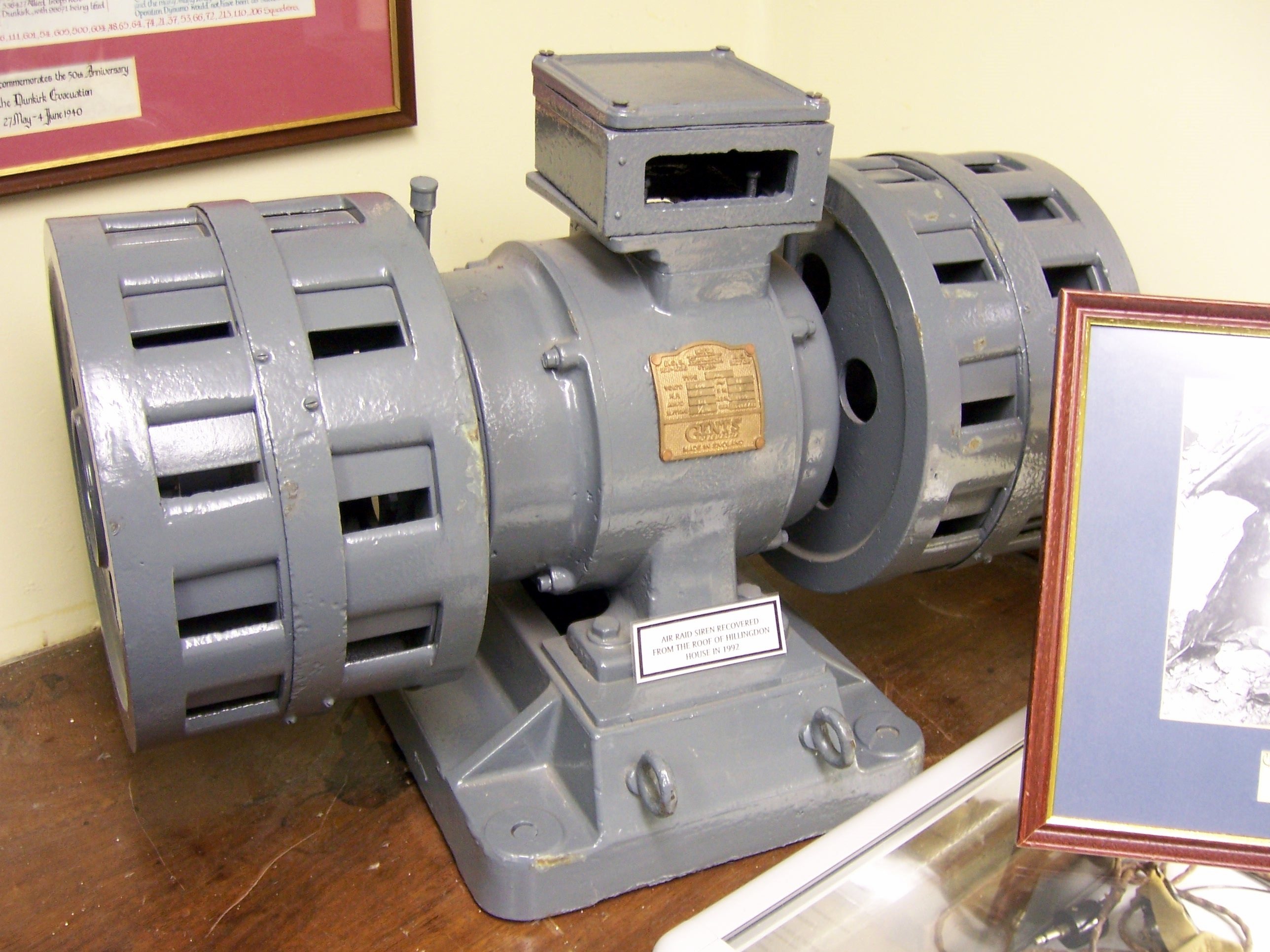
Second World War air raid siren from the roof of Hillingdon House

On 1 March 1929, the Royal Observer Corps established its headquarters at Hillingdon House, where it remained until transferring to RAF Bentley Priory on 1 March 1936. No. 11 Group formed on the same day under the command of Air Vice Marshal Philip Joubert de la Ferté, using Hillingdon House as its headquarters. On 13 July, RAF Bomber Command was formed from the old HQ Air Defence of Great Britain and was also based in the house, remaining there until 1940 when the command moved to RAF High Wycombe.

No. 11 Group was relocated to RAF Martlesham Heath in 1958, when control of RAF Hillingdon passed from Fighter Command to RAF Technical Training Command and the entire site became known as RAF Uxbridge. The RAF School of Education moved into Hillingdon House from RAF Spitalgate on 10 November. Southern Region Air Traffic Services HQ and the Royal Observer Corps' South East Communications Centre moved into the house in 1960. On 1 November, the Southern Region Air Traffic Services headquarters moved into Hillingdon House. The station had been home since the end of the war to the London Area Control Centre, renamed the London Air Traffic Control Centre in 1948 and the Uxbridge Air Traffic Control Centre in 1957. This eventually transferred to RAF West Drayton, which operated as a satellite station of RAF Uxbridge. HQ Military Air Traffic Operations (HQ MATO) moved into Hillingdon House in January 1965.

During the final years of military ownership, Hillingdon House was occupied by the Service Prosecuting Authority and the Civil Aviation Authority's Air Proximity Board. The house was Grade II listed on 5 June 1984.

=== Redevelopment ===
On 31 March 2010, RAF Uxbridge closed as part of a rationalisation of Ministry of Defence facilities in Greater London. Under redevelopment plans approved by Hillingdon Council in January 2011, the house will be converted to include a restaurant. Provision has also been made to retain the carpenter's block beside the house.
