= RAF Uxbridge =

Air force base in the UK

RAF Uxbridge
- Uxbridge, Hillingdon, Greater London in UK
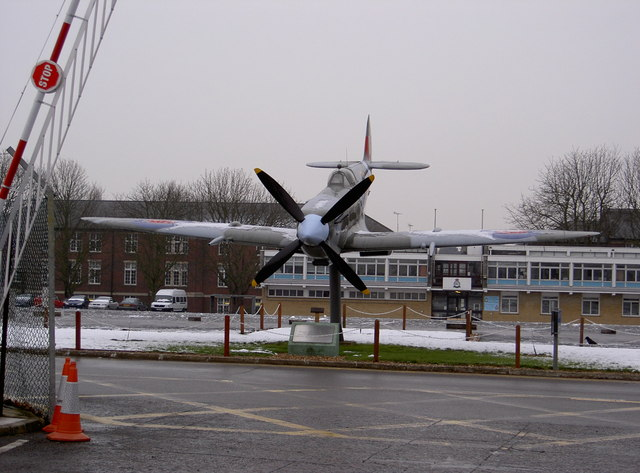
- A full-size model Spitfire gate guard at the entrance to RAF Uxbridge.

- Juventutem formamus (Latin for 'We form youth')

Site information
- Type: Non-flying administrative, headquarters and support station
- Owner: Ministry of Defence
- Operator: Royal Flying Corps (1917–1918); Royal Air Force (1918–2010)
- Open to the public: Yes (Battle of Britain Bunker)
- Condition: Closed

Location
- Location within Greater London
- Coordinates: 51°32′32″N 0°28′11″W
- Area: 46 hectares (110 acres)

Site history
- Built: 1917
- In use: 1917–2010
- Fate: Site sold by MOD for redevelopment, majority of station buildings demolished.; Operations room now Battle of Britain Bunker Museum
- Battles/wars: Battle of Britain; Evacuation of Dunkirk; Preparation for D-Day; Normandy Campaign

RAF Uxbridge was a Royal Air Force (RAF) station in Uxbridge, within the London Borough of Hillingdon, occupying a 44.6-hectare (110-acre) site that originally belonged to the Hillingdon House estate. The British Government purchased the estate in 1915, three years before the founding of the RAF. Until the outbreak of the Second World War in 1939, the station was open to the public.

The station is best known as the headquarters of No. 11 Group RAF, which was responsible for the aerial defence of London and the south-east of England during the Battle of Britain. Hillingdon House served as the group's headquarters. A bunker, subsequently known as the Battle of Britain Bunker, was built nearby to house the 11 Group Operations Room, which controlled fighter squadrons operating within the group. The Operations Room was also responsible for providing air support during the evacuation of Dunkirk in May 1940 (Operation Dynamo) and the D-Day landings (Operation Overlord). It was here that Winston Churchill first said, "Never in the history of mankind has so much been owed by so many to so few", which he repeated in a speech to Parliament four days later.

RAF Uxbridge closed on 31 March 2010 as part of a reduction in the number of Ministry of Defence installations in the Greater London area. Many of its remaining military units were relocated to nearby RAF Northolt the following day. Plans for redevelopment, consisting of a mixture of new residential and commercial properties and the retention of all listed buildings, were approved in January 2011. A small part of the station incorporating the Battle of Britain Bunker retains the RAF Uxbridge name and is owned by Hillingdon Council.

The River Pinn runs through the site from north to south, passing Hillingdon House and the Battle of Britain Bunker. The land around the river is mainly wooded and designated as greenbelt, and Hillingdon Golf Course borders the south of the station. A footpath through the site that had closed in 1988 was reopened in 2011.

== History ==
=== Early years ===
The southern entrance to Hillingdon House, c. 1900, later to become St Andrew's Gate.

The area that became RAF Uxbridge was long a part of the estate of Hillingdon House, built as a hunting lodge in 1717 by the Duke of Schomberg, who staged regular hunts in the grounds. He was a German-born general serving under the future King William III, and was knighted for his part in the 1690 Battle of the Boyne.

The Marchioness of Rockingham, widow of Prime Minister Charles Watson-Wentworth, 2nd Marquess of Rockingham, bought the house in 1786 for £9,000 (equivalent to £1,222,000 in 2025) following her husband's death and lived there until her own death in 1804. She left the estate to her stepsister Elizabeth, widow of William Weddell MP, who sold it to Josias Du Pré Porcher in 1805.

In 1810 the estate was sold to Richard Henry Cox, grandson of Richard Cox, founder of the travel company Cox & Kings. Cox & Co, as the company was then known, was formed after Richard Cox was appointed agent to the Foot Guards (later the Grenadier Guards), and provided banking services for many regiments of the British Army by the end of the 18th century. The mansion was completely rebuilt after it burnt down in 1844 and later received a Grade II listing as a historic site.

=== First World War ===
In 1914 the mansion was put on the market by the estate of Frederick Cox, Richard Henry Cox's grandson. It was described as "a brick and stone building, partly stuccoed, with extensive outbuildings and ornamental gardens". The house and gardens, together with the surrounding parkland and an artificial lake created by damming a section of the River Pinn, amounted to over 81 ha (200 acres).

The British Government purchased the estate in 1915, with the intention of establishing a prisoner of war camp. The local population strongly opposed the plan, causing the government to relent, and the site instead became the Canadian Convalescent Hospital to care for troops evacuated from the front line during the First World War. The hospital opened on 20 September 1915. It was joined on 19 November 1917 by the Royal Flying Corps Armament School which moved into Hillingdon House with 114 officers and 1,156 men, making a donation of £2289.12s.9d (£137,333.91 in 2025) to the Canadian Red Cross. The RFC used parts of the estate not required by the Canadians, and established firing ranges for the training of recruits in ground gunnery. A total of eight of these ranges were built along the River Pinn; one remains today. The hospital closed on 12 December 1917.

On 1 April 1918, the Uxbridge site came under control of the Royal Air Force, which had been formed that day by the amalgamation of the Royal Flying Corps and the Royal Naval Air Service. The following month it became the first RAF station to receive a royal visit, from King George V.

=== Inter-war years ===
The Recruits Training Depot and a detachment of the RAF Depot from RAF Halton arrived in August 1919, merging to form No. 1 Depot, RAF Uxbridge. The station itself was designated RAF Central Depot, Uxbridge. The site was then split to form two new RAF stations, the area to the east of the River Pinn heading uphill to Hillingdon House becoming RAF Hillingdon and the remainder RAF Uxbridge. That year, the building that became the station cinema was opened, designed by Lieutenant J. G. N. Clift of the Royal Engineers, and served as a lecture hall for new recruits.

The RAF School of Music moved to RAF Uxbridge from Hampstead in September 1919. Headquarters Southern Area, Southern Area Medical Headquarters, Southern Area Barrack Stores, and the Southern Area and South Eastern Area Headquarters of the Air Construction Service moved into Hillingdon House in October 1919. T. E. Lawrence, better known as "Lawrence of Arabia", underwent initial training at the Uxbridge Depot in 1922 after enlisting in the RAF under the assumed name John Hume-Ross. He recounted his experiences in The Mint.

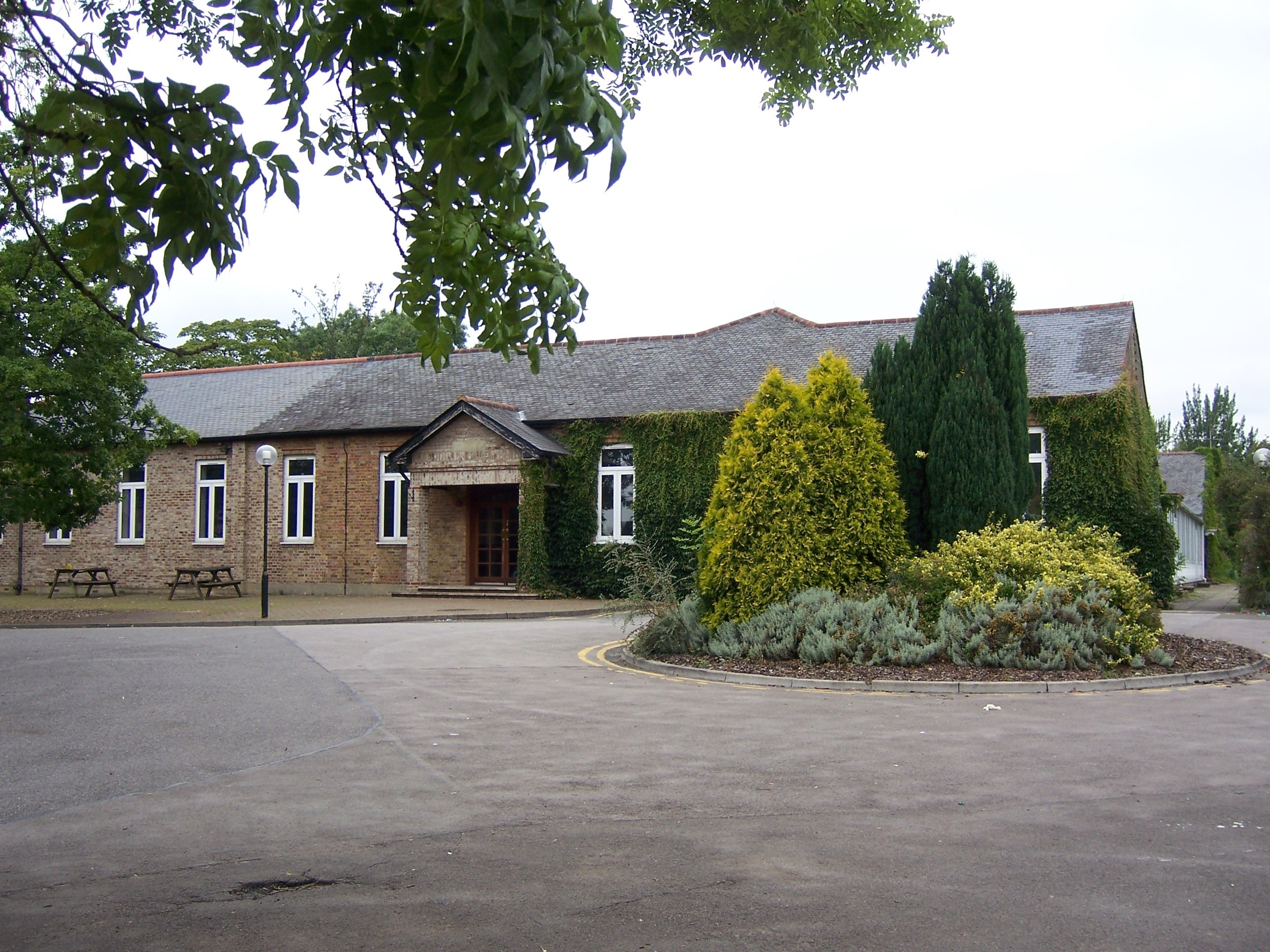
The Officers' Mess building at RAF Uxbridge

Uxbridge Football Club was provided with the use of the station stadium from 1923 and played evening matches there. Ten barrack blocks designed by A. Gilpin were built around the parade ground in 1925, as was the RAF officers' hospital and the original Operations Room, controlled by the Fighting Area of Air Defence of Great Britain (ADGB). The Air Ministry chose RAF Uxbridge as the new base for ADGB on 14 January 1926 owing to its proximity to Whitehall. The site had the added advantage of lying on the fringes of London and therefore difficult for an enemy to locate and bomb.

Having also housed a gymnasium, the lecture hall building became the station cinema in 1927, initially for the use of station personnel only but soon opened to the general public. On 1 March 1929, the headquarters of the Observer Corps was established at Hillingdon House; Air Commodore Edward Masterman was appointed its first commandant. The Observer Corps remained at RAF Uxbridge until 1 March 1936, when it transferred to RAF Bentley Priory.

Owing to its wooden construction the original Operations Room could only be used during the summer months; maintenance of the signalling and communications equipment became difficult under damp winter conditions. A memo dated 16 January 1933, sent to the senior Air Staff Officer, Wing Commander Modin, stated:

Uxbridge Royal Air Force buildings would provide an easy bombing target from all points of view, I feel that our Operations Room at least must go underground ... and the sooner it is put there the better, as not only will the re-installation of communications and apparatus generally take time, but if that machinery is to function smoothly in a sudden emergency, installation must have been completed and the whole layout repeatedly worked and tried out before the danger of such emergency arises.

Douglas Bader arrived at the military hospital in 1932 to recover from the amputation of his legs following an air crash. During his stay Bader met the Desoutter brothers, who were beginning to make lightweight artificial legs from aluminium. Once fitted with artificial legs, Bader fought hard to regain his former abilities and in time his efforts paid off. He was able to drive a specially modified car, play golf and even dance. During his convalescence, Bader met his future wife Thelma Edwards, a waitress at The Pantiles tearooms in Bagshot 25 miles away.

Formed on 1 May 1936, No. 11 Group RAF was headquartered at RAF Uxbridge under the command of Air Vice Marshal Philip Joubert de la Ferté, who was succeeded by Sir Ernest Gossage in January 1937. The ADGB was reorganised on 13 July 1936, with control of fighter aircraft passing to the newly established RAF Fighter Command, which moved to RAF Bentley Priory. The following day the remaining elements of ADGB became RAF Bomber Command, headquartered in Hillingdon House.

Planning for the new 11 Group Operations Room, within what became known as the Battle of Britain Bunker, began in August 1937. Initially it was to be buried 66 feet (20 m) below ground, but problems with the local London Clay on the site meant it was eventually built by Sir Robert McAlpine at a depth of 60 feet (18 m), and was still able to withstand being hit by a 500-pound (230 kg) bomb. The bunker was designed by Bob Creer of the Air Ministry. Work began in February 1939 and finished in August, ten days before the outbreak of the Second World War. The original Operations Room on the surface remained as a back-up, but was not required for that purpose and was renamed Building 76. Also in August 1939, Bomber Command moved to Iver. On 2 September the new Operations Room and RAF Uxbridge reached operational war readiness. The station closed to the public on the outbreak of war, and the football club was required to suspend its use of the stadium.

=== Second World War ===
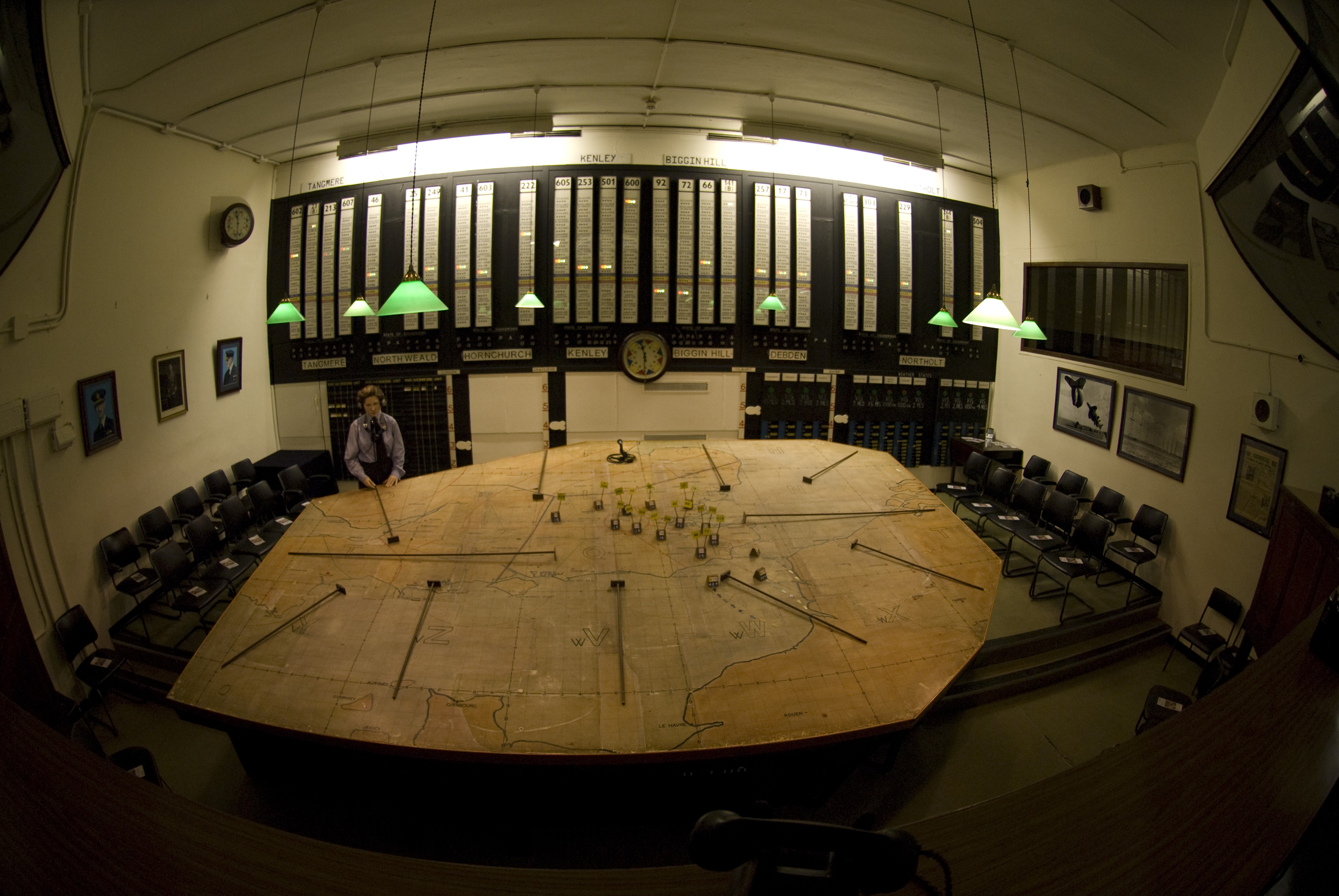
The plotting table inside the Battle of Britain Bunker

During the war, RAF Uxbridge was tasked with despatching personnel to and from training and operational units in Northern France. It also housed the RAF Uxbridge Language School, where Polish Air Force pilots were taught key RAF codewords. Pilots practised formation flying on the station football pitch, using tricycles fitted with radios, compasses and speed indicators. British Expeditionary Force troops returning from Dunkirk were processed at Uxbridge. In mid-1940, staff at the station processed an average of 2,500 recruits and experienced troops per week.

During the Battle of Britain, between July and October 1940, RAF Fighter Command at RAF Bentley Priory received air threat warnings that it filtered to remove duplication, doubt and confusion. These were then forwarded to the Operations Room at RAF Uxbridge, which allocated appropriate defence resources and passed orders on to No. 11 Group sector airfields. No. 11 Group personnel doubled to 20,000 between April and November 1940. The RAF officers' hospital was converted to the Women's Auxiliary Air Force (WAAF) hospital early in 1940.

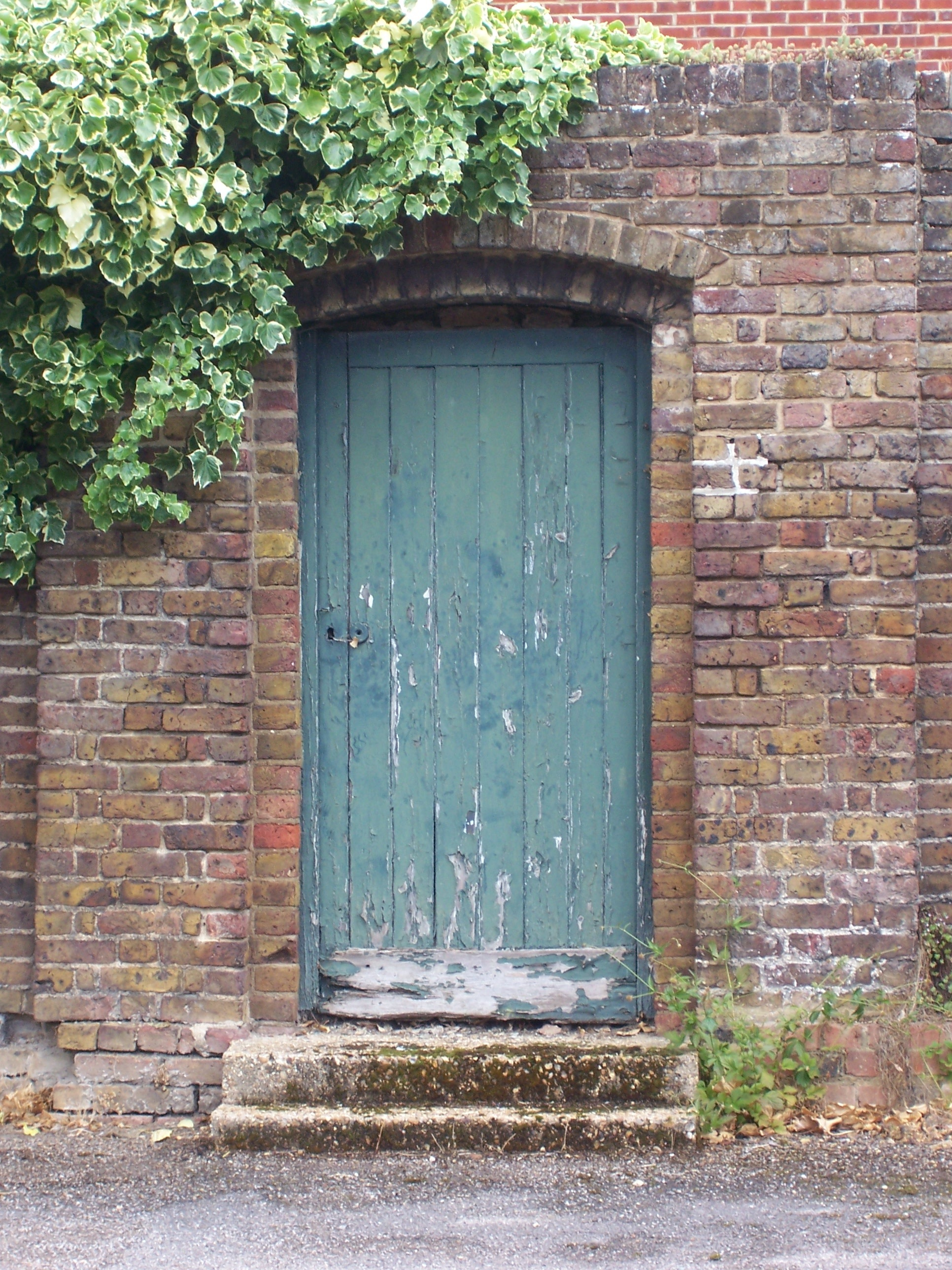
The doorway to the former Park House, used by Air Vice Marshal Sir Keith Park

While overseeing the operations at RAF Uxbridge, Air Vice Marshal Park stayed in a house opposite the entrance to the bunker. He used a small door to reach the bunker from the house each day. The house, named after the war in Park's honour, was demolished in 1996 to make way for newly constructed married quarters; only the garden wall and door were retained. Wing Commander Willoughby de Broke received the Air Force Cross on 11 July 1940 for his service as a Senior Operations Officer for No. 11 Group, working within the Operations Room.

Prime Minister Winston Churchill visited the station on 16 August 1940, to monitor the battle from the Operations Room. He subsequently made his well-known comment, "Never in the field of human conflict was so much owed by so many to so few", to General Ismay as they got into their car to leave. Churchill repeated the quote in a speech to Parliament four days later. King George VI and Queen Elizabeth visited the station on 6 September. Churchill was again present at RAF Uxbridge on 15 September 1940, the fiercest day of fighting of the entire battle and later named Battle of Britain Day. As the last squadrons were sent into battle, Churchill asked Air Vice Marshal Sir Keith Park, "How many reserves have we?" Park answered, "There are none."

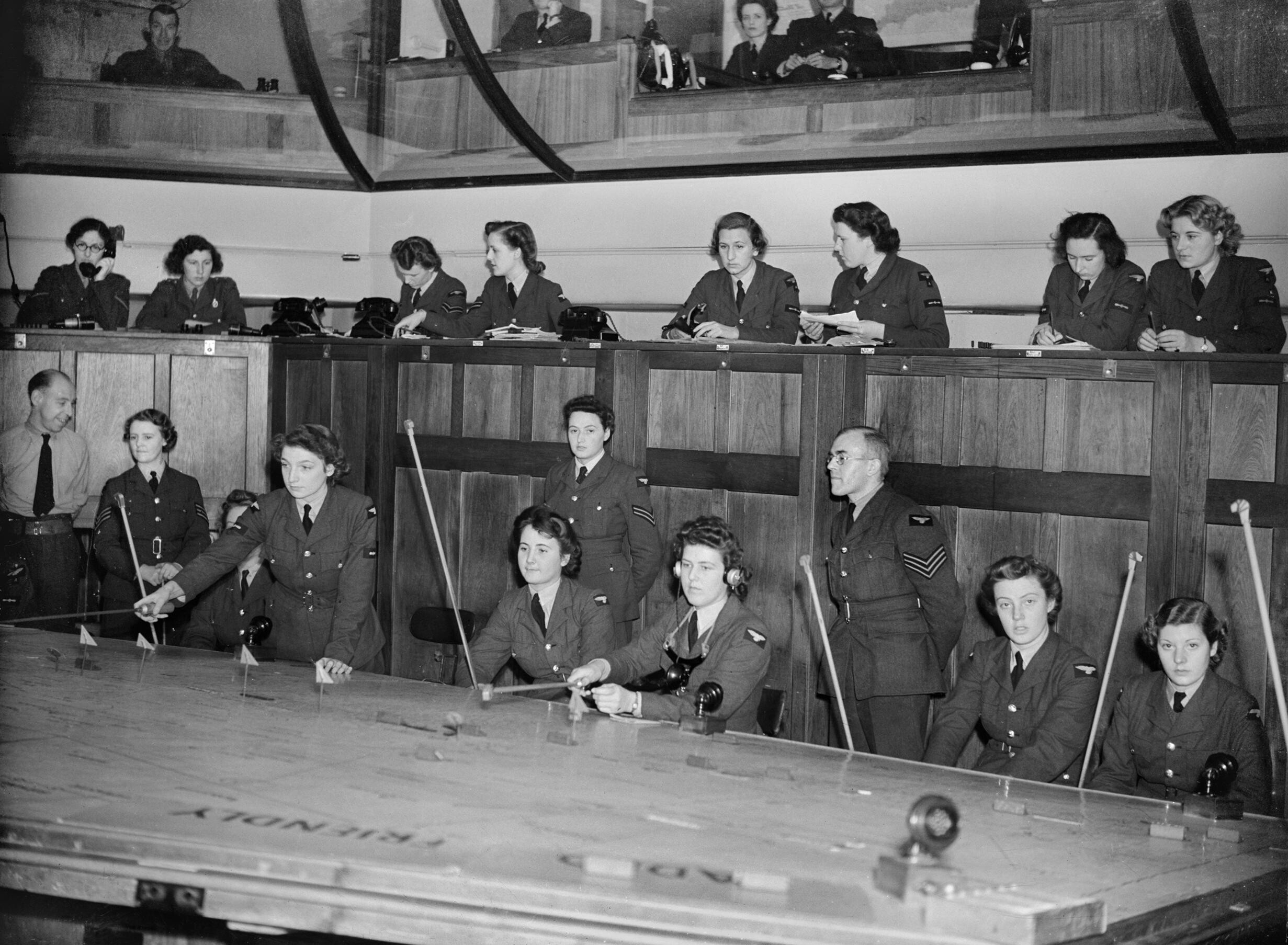
WAAF plotters at work in the Operations Room at No. 11 Group RAF at Uxbridge, 1942

A delayed-action landmine fell on the station on 26 September 1940, between the police school and WAAF Quarters where it remained until it was defused the following day. Two days later on 28 September a bomb fell into a tree 50 yards (46 m) from the Operations Room and was later taken to Harefield where it was defused. A Junkers Ju 88 attacked the station on 6 October 1940, dropping a bomb beside the Navy, Army and Air Force Institutes (NAAFI) grocery shop. The device damaged water and gas mains but caused no casualties. Few bombs fell on the station; Luftwaffe pilots may have mistaken the glass greenhouses at the Lowe & Shawyer plant nursery west of the station for a large body of water not on their maps.

The king and queen returned on 1 November 1941, by which time a "Royal Box" had been installed in the Operations Room from which they could observe the plotting activities. During 1942, General Charles de Gaulle, Sir Anthony Eden and Lord Mountbatten all visited the 11 Group Operations Room. The actors Rex Harrison (then a squadron leader liaising with Bomber Command), Cyril Raymond and Ronald Adam all served within the Operations Room during the war.

In 1941, a division of the Meteorological Office was established at RAF Uxbridge as part of the Intelligence Branch. On 1 July that year, the station Sick Quarters were merged with the WAAF hospital to create the RAF Station Hospital. No. 11 Group was involved in providing air support for the Dieppe Raid (Operation Jubilee) on 19 August 1942. Air Marshal Trafford Leigh-Mallory commanded participating Allied air forces from the No. 11 Group Operations Room. The air operations section of Operation Overlord—the Normandy landings on 6 June 1944 (D-Day)—was also controlled from RAF Uxbridge. Orders from the station were the only ones issued to Allied air units on the day. The headquarters of the 2nd Tactical Air Force and 9th Tactical Air Force of the USAAF were stationed at Uxbridge while preparations were made for the invasion. On D-Day, the No. 11 Group Controller was responsible for ensuring sufficient air patrols of the United Kingdom, the main shipping routes, and the beach landing areas.

=== Post-war years ===
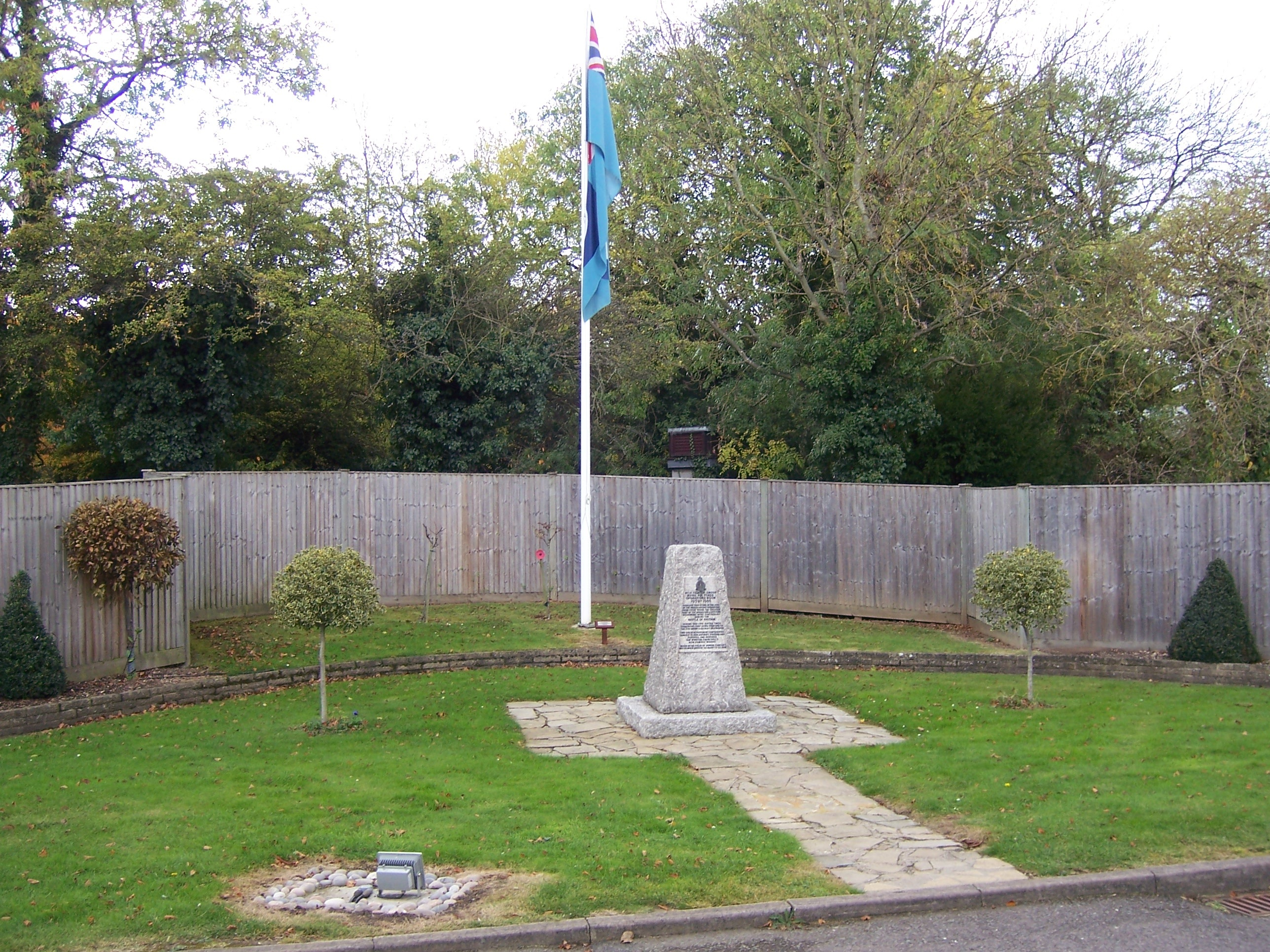
Memorial to the No. 11 Group Operations Room, with the Royal Air Force Ensign

RAF Uxbridge served as an athlete's village for the male competitors in the 1948 Summer Olympics. Swimmers trained at nearby Uxbridge Lido, and female athletes were housed at RAF West Drayton. Personnel from RAF Uxbridge were moved out to RAF Stanmore Park and transported back to the station daily for their shifts. In 1949, the RAF Cricket Association opened on Vine Lane on the western boundary of the station. Also moving into the stations grounds in October of that year were the 14F squadron or the Air Training Corps, their access also being via Vine Lane. The station's badge was approved in April 1953, incorporating a drill sergeant's pace stick to symbolise the training of recruits, and a bugle to represent the Central Band of the RAF; Uxbridge was the first RAF station in Middlesex to have a badge approved.

The ceremonial entrance to the north-west of the station, St Andrew's Gate, was officially opened on 16 December 1957 to mark the link between Uxbridge and the Royal Air Force. A memorial to the personnel of No. 11 Group, made of Cornish granite, was placed in the ground above the Operations Room in 1957. No. 11 Group moved to RAF Martlesham Heath on 14 April 1958 and the room was soon sealed in its original condition. The memorial was unveiled by Air Chief Marshal Lord Dowding on 23 April 1958 in a ceremony attended by Group Captain Douglas Bader and Wing Commander Lord Willoughby de Broke, among others, and marked by a flypast of the Battle of Britain Memorial Flight. Control of RAF Hillingdon passed from Fighter Command to Technical Training Command that year, at which time the entire site became known as RAF Uxbridge. The RAF School of Education moved into Hillingdon House from RAF Spitalgate on 10 November 1958, and the station was subsequently merged with No. 22 Group RAF.

The station was granted the Freedom of the London Borough of Hillingdon on 19 March 1960, an honour allowing the station's personnel to march throughout the borough in uniform. On 1 November that year, the Queen's Colour Squadron of the RAF Regiment moved to Uxbridge and the Southern Region Air Traffic Services headquarters moved into Hillingdon House. After the war, the station was already home to the London Area Control Centre, renamed the London Air Traffic Control Centre in 1948 and the Uxbridge Air Traffic Control Centre in 1957. This eventually transferred to RAF West Drayton but remained under the parentage of RAF Uxbridge.

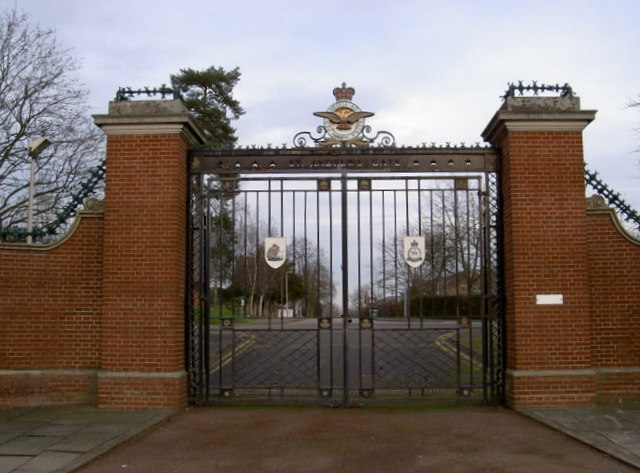
St. Andrew's Gate, the ceremonial entrance to RAF Uxbridge

The 11 Group Operations Room was extensively surveyed in order for a replica to be built at Pinewood Studios for the 1969 film Battle of Britain. Scenes for the 1996 television miniseries Over Here and an episode of Richard Holmes' War Walks were filmed in the Operations Room itself. The reinforced Uniter building was built on the site in the 1970s to house communications equipment. Although no longer used for this purpose, the building contains two fuel storage tanks. The main entrance to the station was moved in 1972 from beside the station cinema to its present location roughly 50 yards (46 m) south.

Over nine months in 1975, the 11 Group Operations Room was restored by No. 9 Signals Unit. The original map was repaired and returned to the table by the RAF Cartography unit, and the board detailing the readiness and activities of each sector squadron was rebuilt to resemble its status on 15 September 1940. In 1985 a museum was created within the bunker by Warrant Officer Robert "Chris" Wren and the Operations Room opened for group visits.

In January 1981, the Provisional Irish Republican Army (IRA) planted a bomb in the Suvla barrack block at RAF Uxbridge. The device was discovered and the thirty-five RAF musicians and fifteen airmen living there were evacuated before it exploded. Following the incident, an enquiry began and security at all RAF stations was reviewed. The following year, many RAF personnel from the station were deployed during the Falklands War. The station went on to celebrate its 70th anniversary in 1987 by staging several events that raised £30,000 (£86,800 in 2025) for the RAF Benevolent Fund.

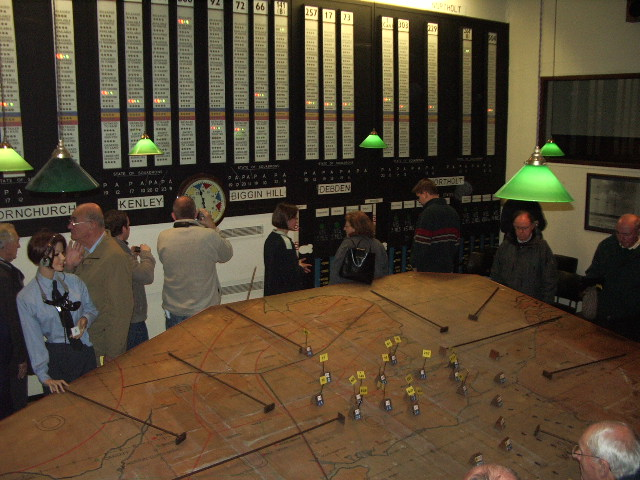
The restored Operations Room in the No. 11 Group Battle of Britain Bunker

RAF Uxbridge also became involved in Operation Granby following the Iraqi Invasion of Kuwait in August 1990. Personnel at Uxbridge were prepared for service in the Gulf at that time and deployed in December that year. During the aerial assault on Iraq in January 1991, support group meetings began at the station for the families of service personnel serving during the Gulf War. Prince Edward, Earl of Wessex, visited one of these groups in February 1991.

The station church, St Luke's, became structurally unsound on 21 November 1990 after the foundations failed. The building dated back to 1933 and had been constructed of wood; the walls were pushed out and the floor rose by 4 inches (100 mm). In March 1993, the Leigh-Mallory bridge was opened across the River Pinn, and the church moved into a new permanent home, Building 231, in March 1995. Jim Bolger, then Prime Minister of New Zealand, visited the station in May, and in October the station's new sports centre opened.

RAF Uxbridge personnel were once more prepared for action in the Gulf in 2003 in readiness for Operation Telic in Iraq. A support network for the families of service personnel sent into action was again established at the station. In March 2003 the Under-Secretary of State for Defence was briefed at Uxbridge as part of preparations for a visit to the Gulf.

Personnel paraded through Uxbridge town centre on 28 November 2007, exercising the freedom of the borough granted to the station in 1960. RAF Uxbridge became a satellite station of RAF Northolt on 1 April 2008, in preparation for eventual closure. In the final years of RAF ownership, the Service Prosecuting Authority and Civil Aviation Authority's UK Airprox Board (investigating air proximity incidents) was based in Hillingdon House. The final of the national Carnegie Champions schools rugby tournament was held at the station in August 2008. The link between RAF Uxbridge and the Royal Observer Corps was renewed in 2008 with the closure of RAF Bentley Priory and the relocation to Uxbridge of ROC memorabilia from the Priory Officers' Mess for safekeeping and display (the Royal Observer Corps having been stood down from operational duties in December 1995).

The Queen's Colour Squadron returned from a six-month tour of duty in Afghanistan in 2009, marked by a homecoming parade through Uxbridge town centre held on 5 August 2009. More than 20,000 people watched the parade, which started from Uxbridge Magistrates Court, passing along the town's High Street to the RAF station.

== RAF units ==
Sources: RAF Uxbridge 90th Anniversary 1917–2007, RAF Uxbridge – A Fond Farewell, and Ministry of Defence.

| Unit | Dates |
|---|---|
| RAF Depot | October 1918– |
| HQ, No. 2 Group RAF | 7 July 1919 – 31 March 1920 |
| No. 1 Squadron RAF | 19 September 1919 – 21 January 1920 |
| No. 24 Squadron RAF | 19 September 1919 – 1 February 1920 |
| No. 4 Squadron RAF | 20 September 1919 – 30 April 1920 |
| HQ, Southern Area | 20 September 1919 – 1 April 1920 |
| No. 39 Squadron RAF | 20 December 1919 – 12 April 1920 |
| No. 3 Squadron RAF | 27 October 1919 – 21 January 1920 |
| No. 207 Squadron RAF | 16–20 January 1920 |
| HQ, Inland Area | 1 April 1920 – 1 June 1926 |
| HQ, Air Defence of Great Britain | 1 June 1926 – 13 July 1936 |
| HQ, Fighting Area | 7 July 1926 – 1 May 1936 |
| HQ, Bomber Command | 14 July 1936 – 13 March 1940 |
| HQ, No. 11 Group RAF | 1 May 1936 – 1948 |
| No. 1 Personnel Transit Centre | 23 August – 6 September 1939 |
| No. 8 Aviation Candidates Selection Board | 3 September 1939 – 4 May 1941 |
| No. 1 Aviation Candidates Selection Board | 4 September 1939 – 4 May 1941 |
| No. 2 Aviation Candidates Selection Board | 4 September 1939 – 2 February 1941 |
| HQ, No. 256 Wing | 23–28 April 1940 |
| HQ, 2nd Tactical Air Force | 1 February – 20 August 1944 |
| HQ, No. 28 Group RAF | 24 February 1949 – 6 March 1950 |
| No. 6 Trials Unit | 15 July 1954 – 5 January 1955 |
| HQ, Military Air Traffic Operations (MATO) | 1965 – March 2000 |
| No. 28 Trials Unit | 21 April 1975 – 1976 |
| Queen's Colour Squadron | November 1960 – January 2010 |

== Closure and redevelopment ==
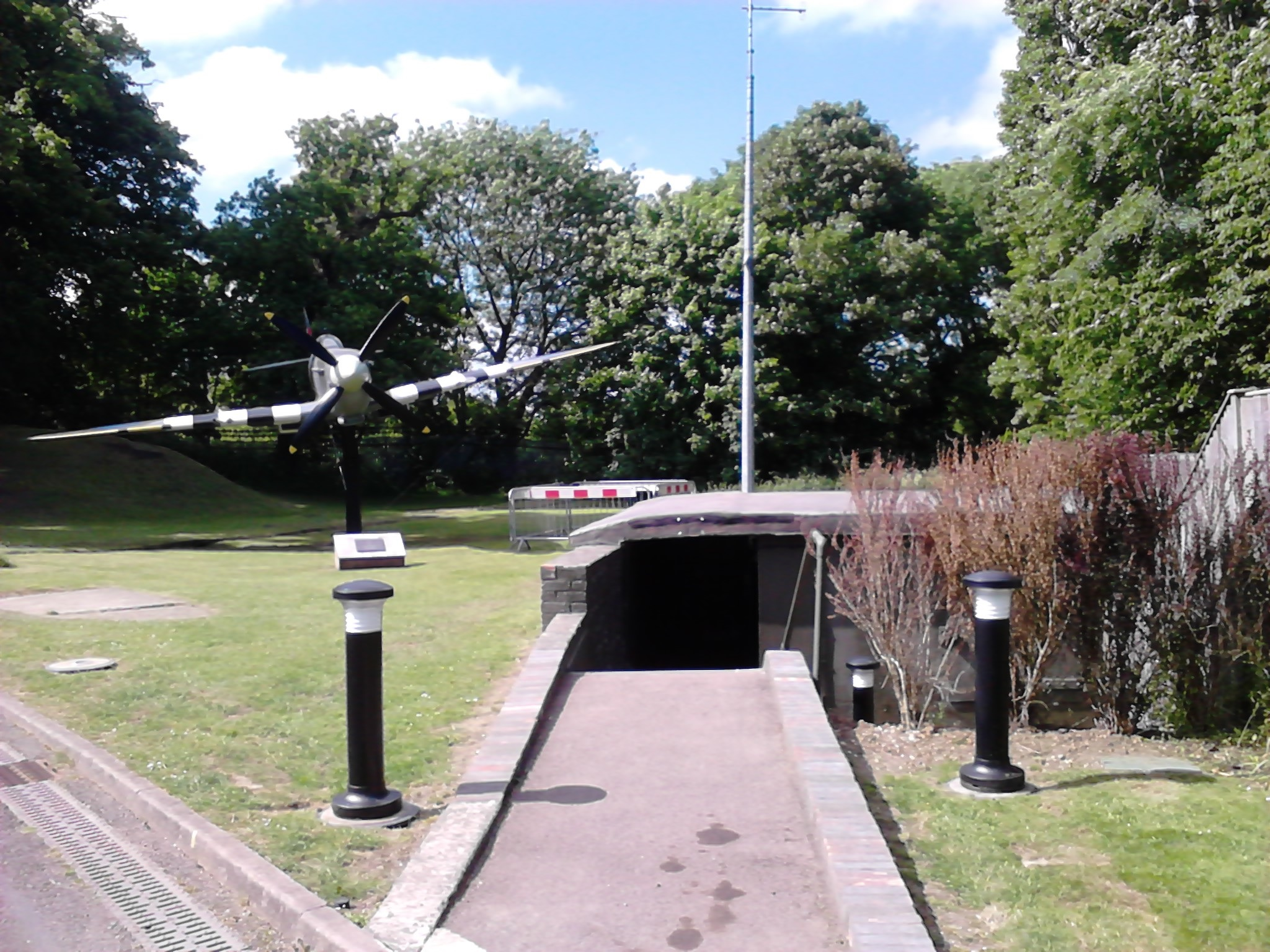
Replica Spitfire gate guardian outside the Battle of Britain Bunker

Prior to the closure of RAF Uxbridge, Queen Elizabeth II sent a message to the station in February 2010, via her equerry, Wing Commander A. D. Calame, who had served as Officer Commanding the Queen's Colour Squadron between 10 August 2005 and 16 July 2007:

Her Majesty was interested to hear that, in this anniversary year, the historic Number 11 Group Operations Rooms Bunker has been listed and will be preserved as a Royal Air Force asset. Hopefully, the facility will continue as a permanent reminder of those who fought and won the Battle of Britain.
Her Majesty hopes that the relocation to Royal Air Force Northolt will continue to progress well, and wishes all personnel at Uxbridge best wishes for the future.

The station closed on 31 March 2010 as part of the Ministry of Defence's Project MoDEL, a programme to reduce the number of defence sites in Greater London in favour of a core site at RAF Northolt. The closure ceremony was overseen by the Mayor of Hillingdon and included parades and the final lowering of the Royal Air Force Ensign over the parade ground. A Supermarine Spitfire conducted a flypast of the station. The final units marched to their new station at RAF Northolt the following day. The station, which had received the Freedom of the Borough of Hillingdon, returned the award to the London Borough of Hillingdon as part of the ceremony, though this was returned on 4 September to be stored in the museum of the Battle of Britain Bunker. A commemorative blue plaque dedicated to Douglas Bader was unveiled by the Mayor of Hillingdon at the entrance to the Officers' Mess.

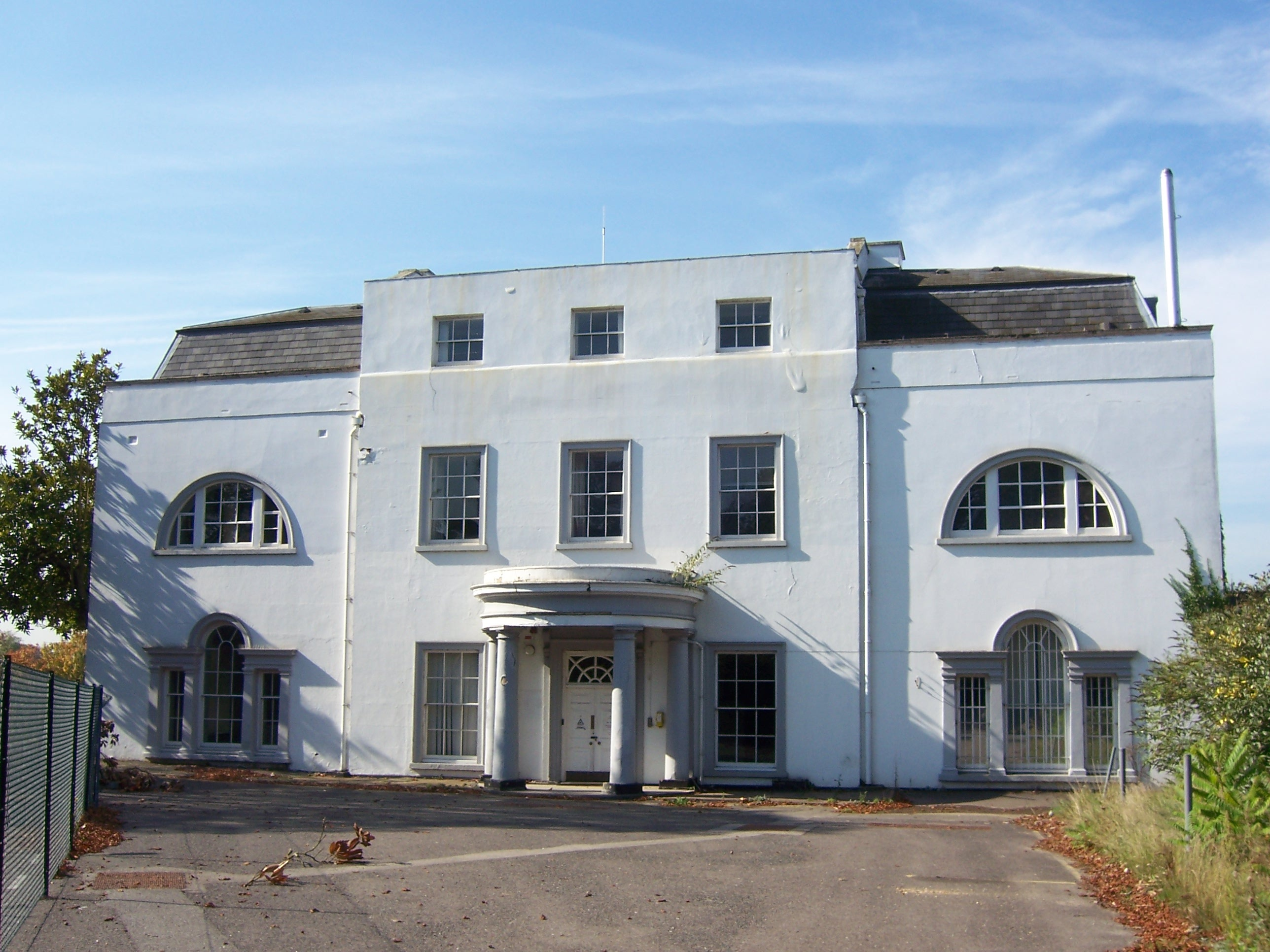
The Grade II listed Hillingdon House prior to renovation.

The Middlesex Wing Headquarters of the Air Training Corps (ATC) had been based at the station together with No. 1083 Squadron ATC, which met on Mondays and Thursdays for parade nights. As part of the closing ceremony, personnel of No. 1083 Squadron were presented with the station badge to adopt as their own. The squadron continued to meet at the station until July 2010, when a newly refurbished building at the TA Centre on Honeycroft Hill became available.

The Grade I listed Battle of Britain Bunker is now preserved as a museum open to the public, while the Grade II listed Hillingdon House would be partially converted into a restaurant. The station cinema is also Grade II listed. The Battle of Britain War Memorial is a scheduled protected monument. Although not listed, several other buildings on the site were identified within the plans for possible retention: the Sick Quarters, the Officers' Mess, the original gymnasium, the carpenters' block in the grounds of Hillingdon House and a building near the Battle of Britain Bunker. St. Andrew's Gate will be retained, as will the Mons barrack block adjacent to the parade ground.

Plans to develop the remaining 44.6 hectares (110 acres) of the site were approved by the London Borough of Hillingdon in January 2011 for 1,340 homes, shops, a theatre and a primary school to be built over ten years. The council intends the development to become an extension of Uxbridge town centre. Early suggestions from the Leader of Hillingdon Council included a theatre with a statue of T.E. Lawrence outside, and a new museum built around the Battle of Britain Bunker. MP for Uxbridge John Randall called in 2009 for Hillingdon Hospital to be relocated to the site as an alternative to a planned rebuilding project on its existing site. The hospital trust ruled out such a move due to the projected costs.

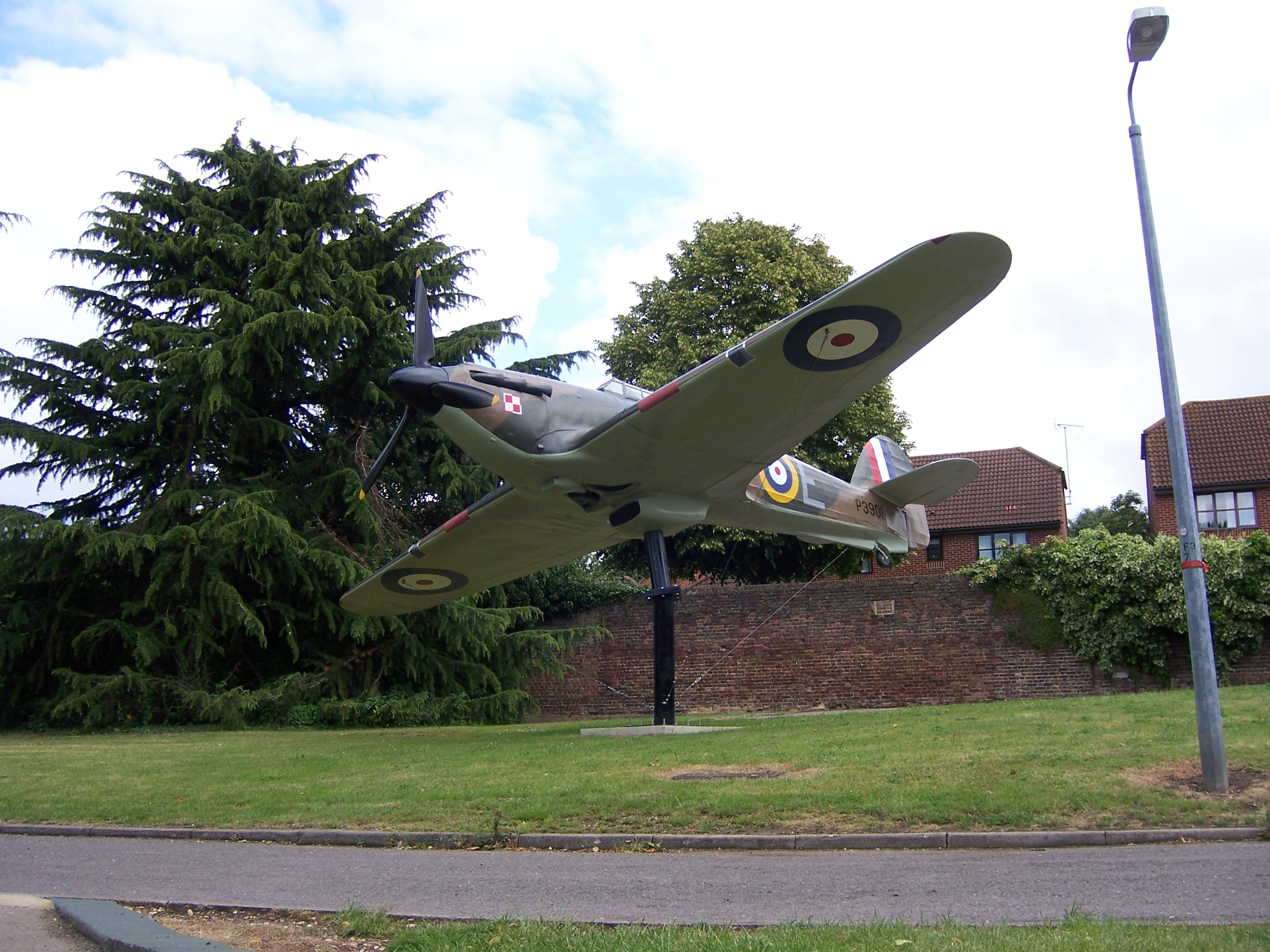
Hurricane gate guardian in the colours of No. 303 Squadron

The area around the Battle of Britain Bunker, including the No. 11 Group memorial, will retain the RAF Uxbridge name and be maintained by RAF Northolt as an exclave. The Royal Air Force Ensign was moved to the area, together with the Supermarine Spitfire gate guardian, a fibreglass replica of aircraft BR600. The Spitfire was refurbished and painted in the D-Day invasion colours of No. 33 Squadron as aircraft BS239, funded by the London Borough of Hillingdon. Uxbridge's first gate guardian was a real Supermarine Spitfire which was unveiled on 23 May 1973. This was sold to a collector for restoration and replaced by the current guardian in 1988. At a service commemorating the Battle of Britain in September 2010, a new Hawker Hurricane gate guardian in the markings of No. 303 Polish Fighter Squadron was unveiled, also near the bunker. The guardian is a fibreglass replica of the aircraft flown by Witold Urbanowicz during the Battle of Britain.

The South Hillingdon branch of the St. John Ambulance service was based at RAF Uxbridge until the closure in 2010 led to a period of uncertainty over its relocation. Eventually, RAF Northolt provided the charity with new premises, which were available from January 2011.

In June 2011, it was announced that the public right of way from St Andrew's Gate in the north-west to Vine Lane in the north-east would be reopened, after work to fence off the pathway was completed. The path, 800 metres (2,600 ft) long, was the subject of a petition submitted to Hillingdon Council in 2010 and had been closed since 1988. The path was reopened in early August 2011.

Since closing, the site has been used extensively for filming. Most recently, scenes for the television drama Endeavour, set in the 1960s, were filmed there.

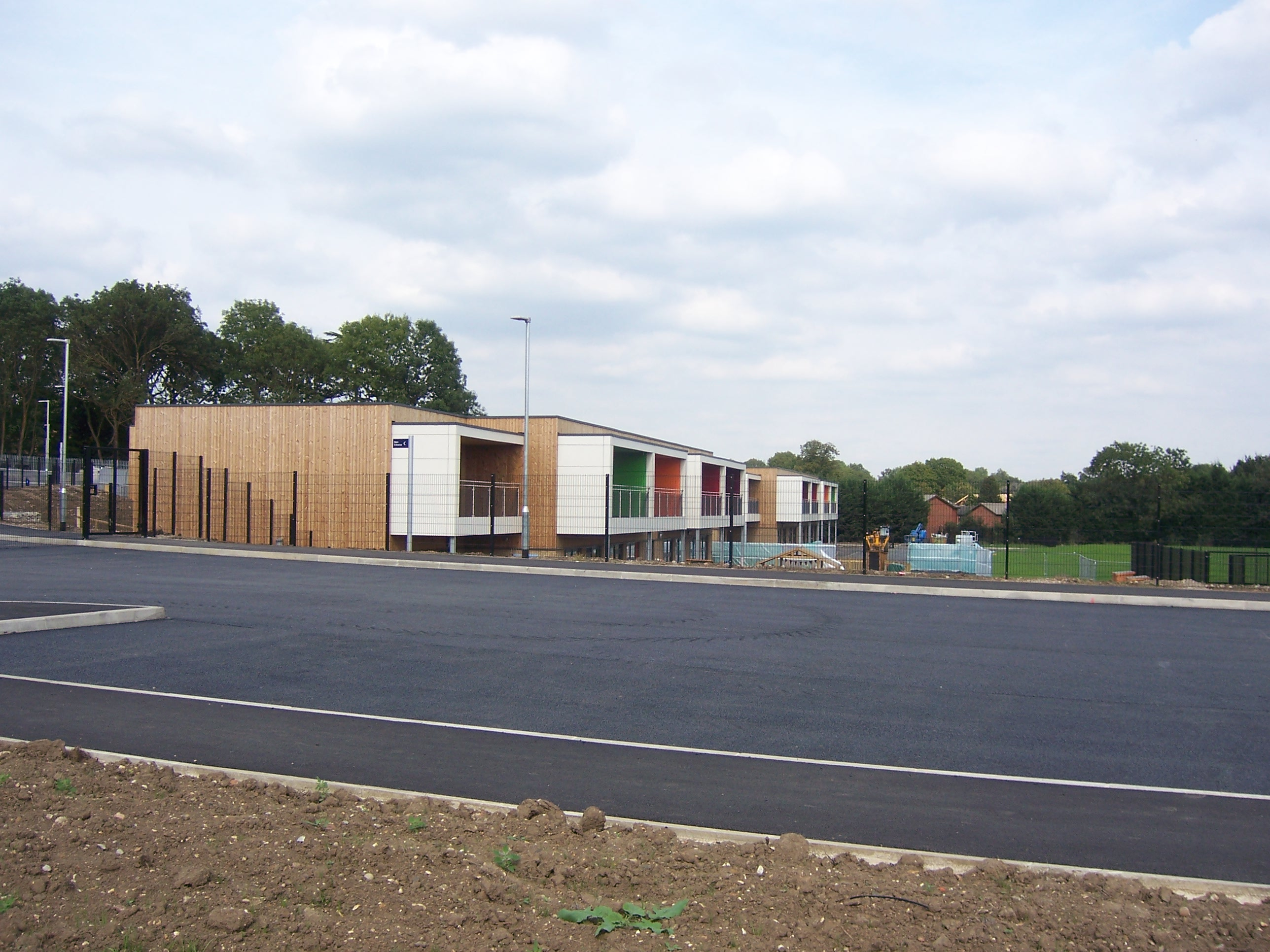
The John Locke Academy opened to its first intake of pupils in September 2014

In April 2012, VSM Estates announced it would be completing the purchase of the site from the MoD, with a view to commencing building work by the end of the year. VSM were provided with a £60 million five-year loan by HSBC, together with funding from joint parent companies, St. Modwen Properties and Vinci plc. Persimmon will develop 8.9 hectares (22 acres) of the site with 500 homes under an existing joint venture agreement with St Modwen. Demolition of the site in phases began in October 2012. The site will be developed under the St Andrew's Park name.

A wood commemorating the Diamond Jubilee of Elizabeth II was planted within the site in May 2012. Each school in the London Borough of Hillingdon was invited to plant a tree, and the Station Commander of RAF Northolt, Group Captain Tim O'Brien, also planted one on behalf of the RAF. The wood was officially dedicated by the London Borough of Hillingdon's Representative Deputy Lieutenant, Wing Commander Edna Partridge, on 19 July 2012.

A ground-breaking ceremony was held on 2 July 2013 on the site, attended by the Mayor of Hillingdon and cabinet members of Hillingdon Council. The development is due to be completed within seven years.

A new primary school, built on the site of the former sports ground and gym, opened in September 2014. Named the John Locke Academy, the school will have 630 primary places and 90 nursery places when fully subscribed.

An additional planning application for the construction of office buildings was submitted by St. Modwen in June 2015.

== See also ==
- List of Battle of Britain airfields
- List of former Royal Air Force stations
