= Portrait of the Marquess of Rockingham =

Painting by Joshua Reynolds

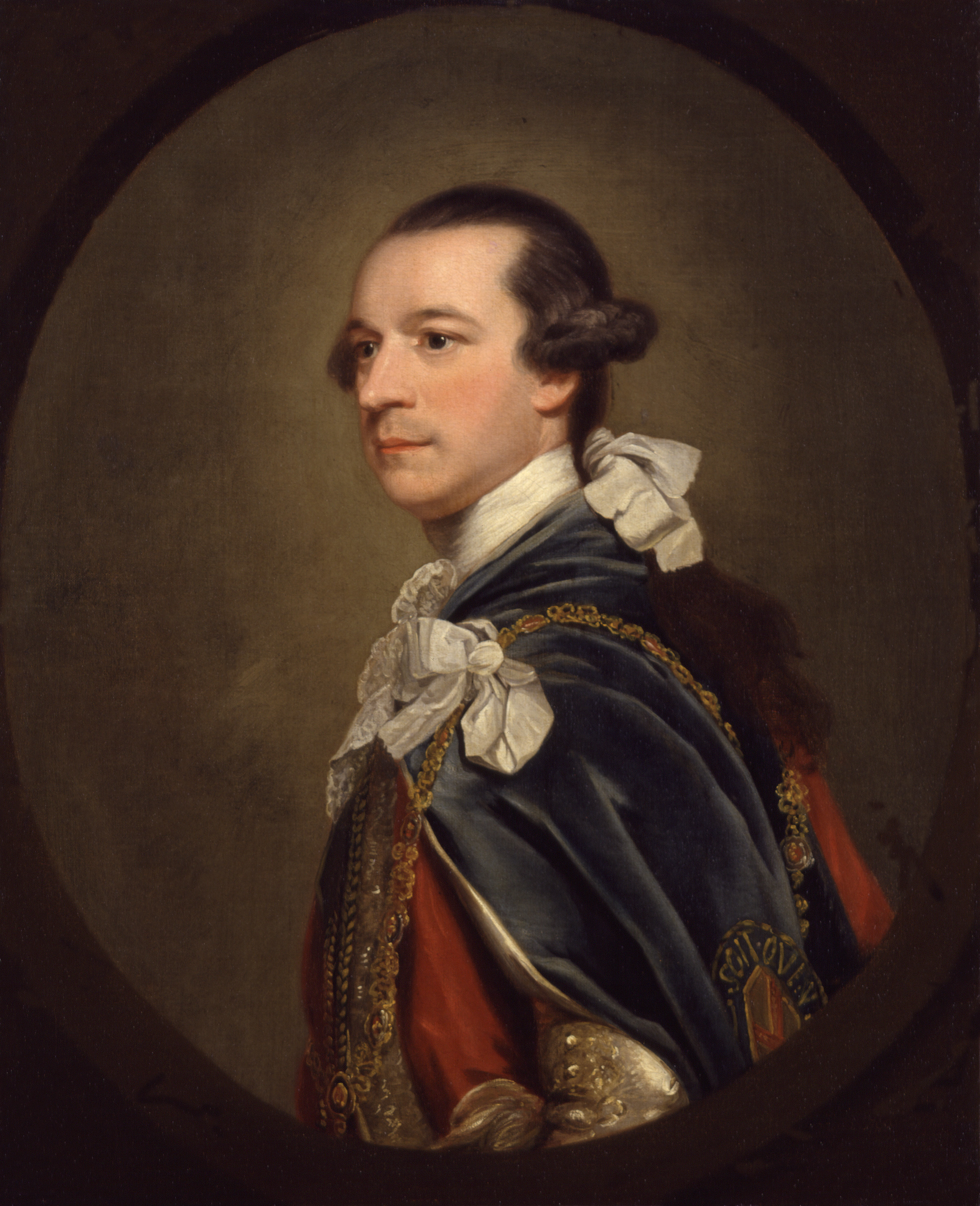
- Artist: after Joshua Reynolds
- Year: c. 1768
- Medium: Oil on canvas
- Subject: Marquess of Rockingham
- Dimensions: 69.2 cm (27.2 in) × 55.9 cm (22.0 in)
- Location: National Portrait Gallery, London
- Accession no.: NPG 406
- Identifiers: Art UK artwork ID: charles-watson-wentworth-2nd-marquess-of-rockingham-158171

Portrait of the Marquess of Rockingham is a c. 1768 portrait painting of the British politician Charles Watson-Wentworth, 2nd Marquess of Rockingham, who twice served as prime minister. It is a scaled-down version of a work by Joshua Reynolds. A wealthy landowner and leader of the Rockingham Whigs, he first became prime minister in 1765 after replacing George Grenville. Leaving office the following year he remained in opposition until 1782 when he returned to the premiership in the final year of the American War of Independence. His second spell was short-lived as he died just months after taking office.

A leading society portraitist, in 1769 Reynolds became the first president of the Royal Academy. His original work is now at St Osyth's Priory, while a full-length replica is in the Royal Collection. The trimmed-down version is in the collection of the National Portrait Gallery, London, having been presented in 1875.
