= Whistlejacket =

Painting by George Stubbs, c. 1762

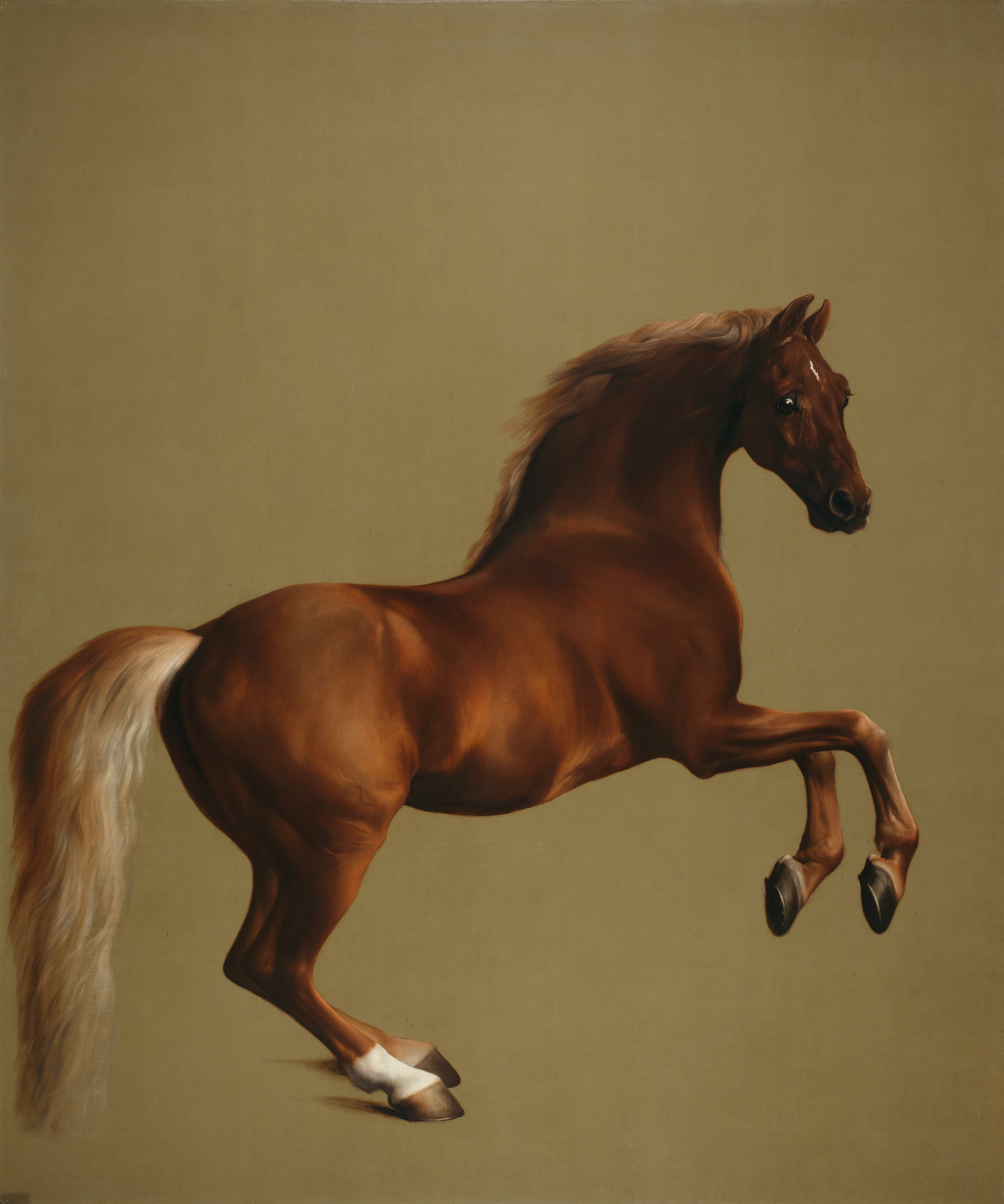
- Artist: George Stubbs (1724–1806)
- Year: c. 1762
- Medium: Oil on canvas
- Dimensions: 292 cm × 246.4 cm (115 in × 97 in)
- Location: National Gallery, London

Whistlejacket is an oil-on-canvas painting from about 1762 by the British artist George Stubbs showing the Marquess of Rockingham's racehorse approximately at life-size, in "levade" against a plain background. The canvas is large, lacking any other content except some discreet shadows, and Stubbs has paid precise attention to the details of the horse's appearance. It has been described in The Independent as "a paradigm of the flawless beauty of an Arabian thoroughbred". The Fitzwilliam family, heirs of the childless Rockingham, retained the painting until 1997 when funding from the Heritage Lottery Fund allowed the National Gallery, London to acquire it for £11 million.

Stubbs was a specialist equine artist who in 1762 was invited by Rockingham to spend "some months" at Wentworth Woodhouse in Yorkshire, his main country house. Stubbs had painted many horse portraits, with and without human figures, but the heroic scale and lack of background of Whistlejacket are "unprecedented" in his work and equine portraits in general and "contemporaries were so astonished that a single horse should command a huge canvas that legends quickly developed" explaining why the painting was unfinished, none of which seem plausible or supported by the evidence to modern art historians. In fact Stubbs's earliest canvases on his visit in 1762 included a pair of much smaller paintings of groups of standing horses, one including Whistlejacket, in a horizontal format "like a classical frieze" with a similar honey beige background broken only by small shadows at the feet. It would seem likely that leaving the portraits without the usual landscape background was Rockingham's idea.

Stubbs depicts Whistlejacket rising to a levade, but with his head turned towards the viewer, in a pose comparable to a number of earlier monumental equestrian portraits, including examples by Rubens and Velázquez, but in these the emphasis is on the rider. Here the horse is alone and in a natural state, producing a "romantic study in solitude and liberty". Like many of Stubbs's other paintings of horses and other animals in the wild, including several versions of a horse attacked by a lion perched on its back, the painting is an early intimation of Romanticism, as well as a challenge to the lowly place animal painting occupied in the hierarchy of genres.

To a greater degree than any earlier painter, Stubbs produced genuinely individual portraits of specific horses, paying intimate attention to details of their form. Minute blemishes, veins, and the muscles flexing just below the surface of the skin are all visible and reproduced with great care and realism. Whistlejacket had already retired after a fairly successful racing career, but was painted in this unusual form to show "a supremely beautiful specimen of the pure-bred Arabian horse at its finest".

== Painting history ==
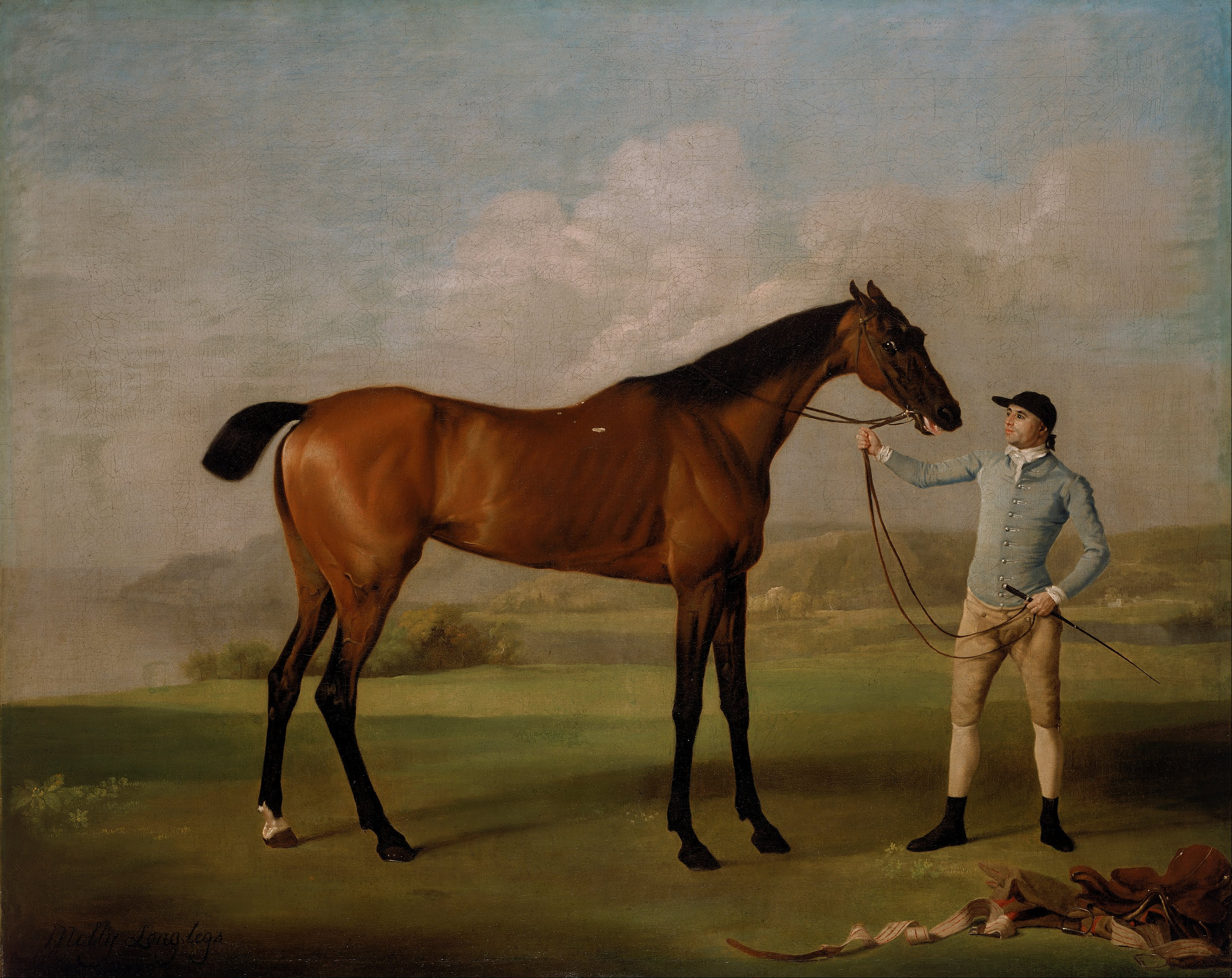
Stubbs's Molly Long-legs with her Jockey (1761–62), a more typical racehorse portrait (101 × 127 cm)

Stubbs's knowledge of equine physiology was unsurpassed by any painter; he had studied anatomy at York and, from 1756, he spent 18 months in Lincolnshire where he carried out dissections and experiments on dead horses to better understand the animal's physiology. He suspended the cadavers with block and tackle to better able sketch them in different positions. The careful notes and drawings he made during his studies were published in 1766 in The Anatomy of the Horse. Even before the publication of his book, Stubbs's dedication to his subject reaped him rewards: his drawings were recognized as more accurate than the work of other equine artists and commissions from aristocratic patrons quickly followed.

Charles Watson-Wentworth, 2nd Marquess of Rockingham was a Whig politician, later to be twice Prime Minister, and exceptionally rich even by the standards of that wealthy group. In 1762 he commissioned Stubbs to produce a series of portraits of his horses, one of which was Whistlejacket. He was also a collector of art, commissioning several works in Italy on his Grand Tour in the late 1740s, but his great leisure interests were, typically for his class, horseracing and gambling. His wife wrote of her hopes that he would restrict himself to gambling "just upon the turf, for there is always a possibility of some sort of pleasure in that; but not the smallest in other sorts". Wentworth House, as it was then known, had been "rebuilt by his father on a huge scale" and empty walls needed filling. Horace Walpole, on the visit in 1766 mentioned below, complained of the un-landscaped park "This lord loves nothing but horses, and the enclosures for them take place of everything".

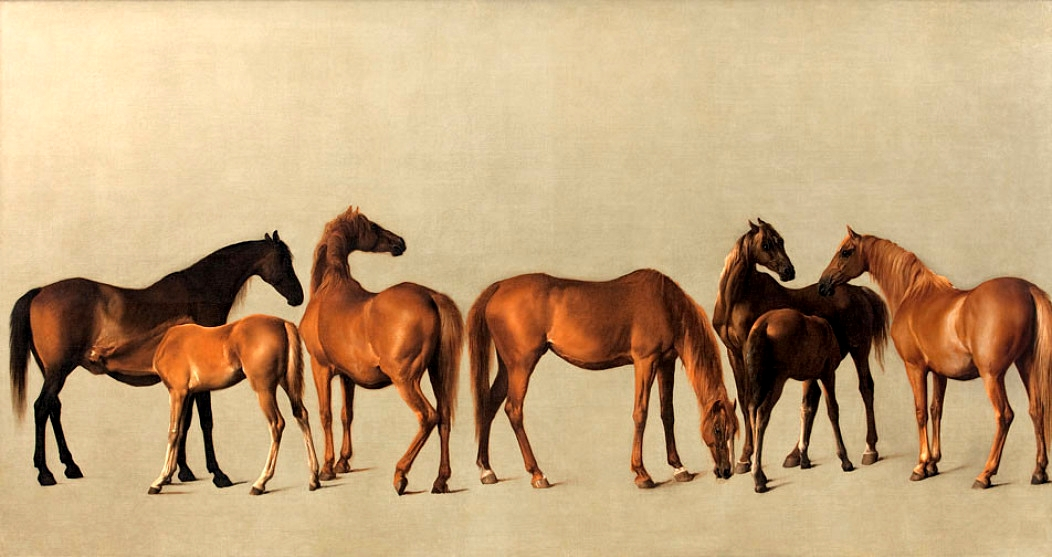
Mares and Foals without a background, other Rockingham horses painted by Stubbs on his visit in 1762. Whistlejacket was in the pair piece showing stallions.

The Wentworth archives, "though unusually comprehensive, contain no clear reference to the commission to paint Whistlejacket", though some indication of the likely price comes from a receipt by Stubbs dated 30 December 1762 for "Eighty Guineas for one Picture of a Lion and another of a Horse Large as Life", probably a different picture for Rockingham's London house. Earlier in 1762, Stubbs had painted a second portrait of Whistlejacket, with two other unnamed stallions and a groom, Joshua or Simon Cobb.

According to a story in the biography of Stubbs by his friend and fellow-painter Ozias Humphrey, when the portrait was nearly finished Whistlejacket was accidentally led in front of it by a stable boy and reacted violently, treating it as a rival stallion, and lifting the boy holding him fully off the ground in his attempts to attack the painting. The story probably originated with Stubbs himself, but is probably too good to be true; it clearly recalls Pliny the Elder's famous story of Zeuxis and Parrhasius.

When Wentworth was remodelled under a later Earl Fitzwilliam, a 40-foot square "Whistlejacket Room" was created to showcase the painting, with only single family portraits by Sir Joshua Reynolds and Sir Thomas Lawrence to keep it company. Wentworth Woodhouse ceased to be occupied by the family after World War II, and the painting was loaned to Kenwood House in London from 1971 to 1981, the Tate Gallery 1984–85, and the National Gallery from 1996 before its purchase the next year. It is now displayed in the centre of room 34, and is framed by doorways at the end of a long enfilade so that it can be seen through ten intervening rooms from the Sainsbury Wing, at the other end of the gallery. It is consistently among the top ten most popular National Gallery paintings in various forms of reproduction. The painting is in "very good condition" and was "lined, cleaned and restored a few years before its acquisition."

=== Legends as to the origin ===
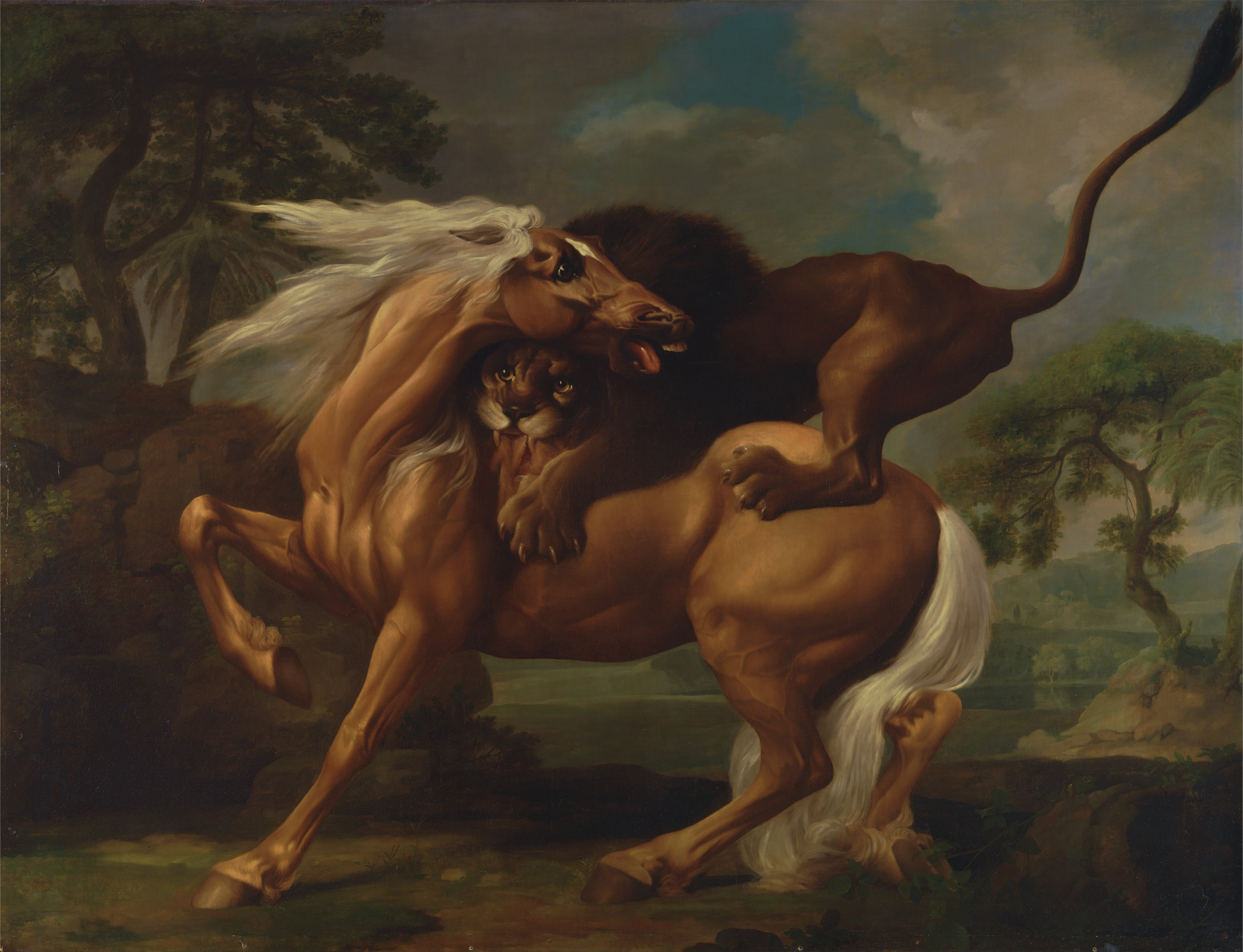
George Stubbs, A Lion Attacking a Horse, also painted in 1762; one of many treatments of this subject by Stubbs

One story was that Rockingham had intended to commission an equestrian portrait of George III; Stubbs would paint the horse while two other notable portrait and landscape painters would fill in the King and the landscape respectively. In one account, The painting was supposedly intended to accompany a similarly sized equestrian portrait of George II by David Morier, but Rockingham then changed his mind. According to Horace Walpole, on a visit to Wentworth where he was probably shown round by the housekeeper, the painting was intended as a gift for the King, but Rockingham supposedly had not bothered to support progress of the painting after falling out of favour, and ordered it hung at Wentworth Woodhouse uncompleted instead.

Another reason popularly given for it being "unfinished" is that Rockingham was so impressed by Whistlejacket's furious reaction when confronted by Stubbs working on the painting in his stable, that he ordered it hung without further decoration. Stubbs produced other paintings of horses against blank backgrounds for Rockingham, nothing in the painting indicates that it is not complete, and the detail of the shadows cast by Whistlejacket's rear legs on the ground suggest that this is how Stubbs intended the picture to be seen.

== Horse history ==
Whistlejacket was a chestnut stallion, with flaxen-coloured mane and tail, believed to be the original colouring of the wild Arabian breed. He was a Thoroughbred race horse foaled in 1749 at the stud of Sir William Middleton, 3rd Baronet at Belsay Castle in Northumberland. His name may come from a contemporary cold remedy containing gin and treacle, of a colour similar to his coat. His sire was Mogul and grandsire was the Godolphin Arabian; through his dam, he was also descended from the Byerly Turk, and various other Arabians and Turks. He raced from 1752, winning many races in the North. He lost to Jason in the King's Plate at Newmarket in 1755, but won the following year, when he was also narrowly beaten by Spectator for the Jockey Club Plate at Newmarket in 1756. He was sold soon after to the Marquess of Rockingham. He famously won a four-mile race at York in August 1759 against a strong field, beating Brutus by a length, and then retired to stud, being ten years old.

He was beaten only four times in his racing career, but was notoriously temperamental and difficult to manage. He was "averagely successful at stud", and must have died before Rockingham's death in 1782, as he is not listed in records of the subsequent sale of the stud; he would have been in his thirties if alive. He was not nearly as famous a horse as his sire and grand-sire, but is mentioned in Act IV of Oliver Goldsmith's classic comic play She Stoops to Conquer (1773) when an elopement is planned: "I have got you a pair of horses that will fly like Whistlejacket".
