= Service Prosecuting Authority =

Defence agency in the UK

Badge of the Service Prosecuting Authority

The Service Prosecuting Authority (SPA) is the organisation within the Ministry of Defence, responsible for consideration of cases referred to it by the Service Police and where appropriate the military chain of command and where necessary the directing and prosecuting of those cases at Courts Martial worldwide and in the Service Civilian Court. Furthermore, it acts as respondent in the Summary Appeal Court and represents the Crown in the Courts Martial Appeal Court (CMAC).

The authority, which is fully independent of the Military Chain of Command and acts under the superintendence of the Attorney General, was formed on 1 January 2009 by the merger of three separate prosecuting authorities: the Army Prosecuting Authority (APA) of the British Army, the Navy Prosecution Authority (NPA) of the Royal Navy and the Royal Air Force Prosecuting Authority (RAFPA). The authority is headed by Mary Cowe, a civil servant, as Director Service Prosecutions. The Deputy Director Service Prosecutions (DDSP) was formerly a Civil Servant position and is now held by a Royal Navy Commodore.

The SPA liaises with the Military Court Service, the office of the Judge Advocate General, the Attorney-General, other prosecuting authorities (including the Crown Prosecution Service), civilian solicitors, and the military and civilian police.

It is staffed by officers from all three of the UK Armed Forces and is supported by a number of civil servants who work for the Ministry of Defence. Its headquarters are at RAF Northolt in West London.

== History ==
As part of the Armed Forces Act 2006, the separate prosecution authorities of the British Armed Forces were merged to form the tri-service Service Prosecuting Authority. On 1 January 2009, the individual authorities were placed under the leadership of one Director as the newly combined authority took effect.

In 2010 the authority moved from Hillingdon House in RAF Uxbridge to a newly built headquarters in RAF Northolt.
