= Mary Watson-Wentworth, Marchioness of Rockingham =

British noblewoman

The Most Honourable The Marchioness of Rockingham
- Born: Mary Liddell; 1735; Pontefract, West Yorkshire, England
- Died: 19 December 1804 (aged 69); Hillingdon House, Hillingdon, London, England
- Resting place: York Minster, North Yorkshire, England
- Known for: Spouse of the prime minister of Great Britain (1765–66; 1782)
- Spouse: Charles Watson-Wentworth, 2nd Marquess of Rockingham (m. 1752; died 1782)
- Parents: Thomas Bright; Margaret Norton

Mary Watson-Wentworth, Marchioness of Rockingham (née Liddell, later Bright; 1735 – 19 December 1804) was the wife of Charles Watson-Wentworth, 2nd Marquess of Rockingham, who was prime minister of Great Britain in 1782, and previously from 1765 to 1766.

== Early life ==
Born c. 1735 in Pontefract, West Yorkshire, England, she was the only child and heiress of Thomas Liddell, Lord of the Manor of Ecclesall, South Yorkshire, and Margaret Norton. She was baptized at Ackworth, West Yorkshire, on 27 August 1735. She and her father were both born with the surname Liddell, but her father took the surname Bright when he inherited Badsworth Hall from his grandfather John Bright.

== Marriage ==
On 26 February 1752, Mary Bright married Whig politician Charles Watson-Wentworth. They were married until Watson-Wentworth's death on 1 July 1782.

She was acknowledged as a skilled politician by contemporaries, with opposition party members sometimes directing their letters straight to her. She was described by herself and others as Rockingham’s "secretary", but Rockingham called her "My Minerva at my elbow." After Rockingham’s death, her correspondent Edmund Burke wrote to her, "Your Names indeed ought to go down together; for it is no mean part you have had in the great services which that great and good man has done to his Country."

Lady Rockingham was the owner of Rockingham Mantua, a silk satin mantua brocaded in silver thread with silver lace trim. It is thought that the Mantua was part of a matching set with her husband. Lady Rockingham mentioned the sets in her letters "Lord Stormont says being in your dress is quite bourgeois, but I hope you will approve of it, I shall take it monstrous if you don't, for I mean it as a compliment to you".

The widowed Lady Rockingham settled at Hillingdon House, Middlesex, in 1785, where she died in 1804 and was buried with her husband at York Minster.
