= Charles Watson-Wentworth, 2nd Marquess of Rockingham =

Prime Minister of Great Britain (1765–1766; 1782)

The Most Honourable The Marquess of Rockingham KG PC FRS
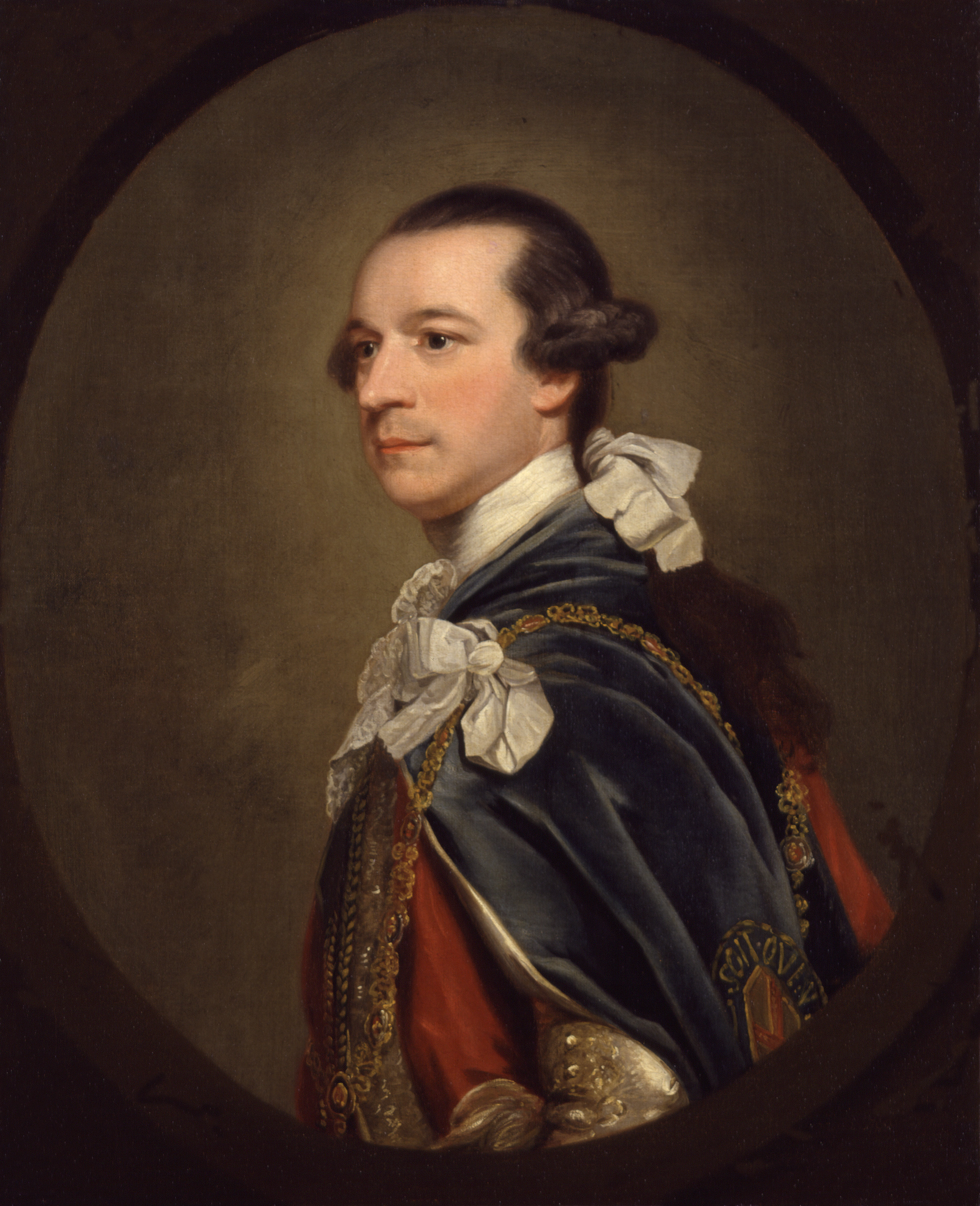
- Portrait of the Marquess of Rockingham, c. 1768

Prime Minister of Great Britain
- In office 27 March 1782 – 1 July 1782
- Monarch: George III
- Preceded by: Lord North
- Succeeded by: The Earl of Shelburne
- In office 13 July 1765 – 30 July 1766
- Monarch: George III
- Preceded by: George Grenville
- Succeeded by: William Pitt the Elder

Personal details
- Born: Charles Watson-Wentworth; 13 May 1730 Wentworth, Yorkshire, England
- Died: 1 July 1782 (aged 52) Wimbledon, England
- Resting place: York Minster, York, England
- Party: Whig
- Spouse: Mary Bright (m. 1752)
- Parents: Thomas Watson-Wentworth, 1st Marquess of Rockingham; Lady Mary Finch
- Education: St John's College, Cambridge

Charles Watson-Wentworth, 2nd Marquess of Rockingham (13 May 1730 – 1 July 1782) was a British Whig statesman and magnate, most notable for his two brief terms of less than a year each as Prime Minister of Great Britain, some 16 years apart. His second term was ended by his death from influenza at the age of 52. He was a leading Whig grandee, and the political patron of many Whigs, known as the Rockingham Whigs, who he managed to hold together during long years out of office. He served in only two high offices during his lifetime (prime minister and leader of the House of Lords) but was nonetheless very influential during his one and a half years of service.

He was styled The Honourable Charles Watson-Wentworth before 1739, Viscount Higham between 1739 and 1746, Earl of Malton between 1746 and 1750, and the Marquess of Rockingham from 1750.

Outside politics, Rockingham was a heavy gambler, on cards and on horse-racing, which was a great interest. He commissioned a number of paintings of his racehorses from George Stubbs, including the life-size Whistlejacket, now in the National Gallery, London.

== Early life: 1730–1751 ==
=== Family and military career ===
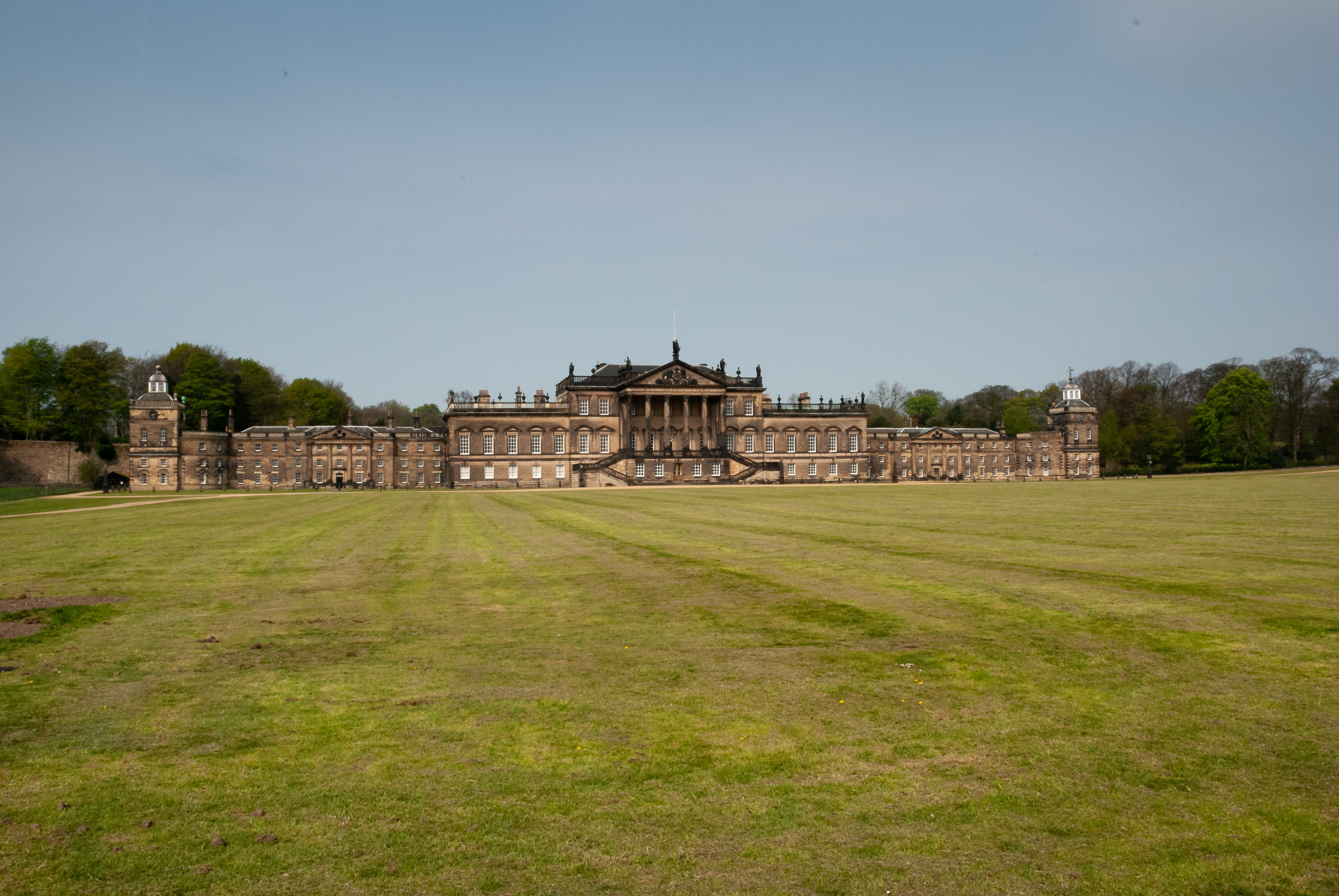
Wentworth Woodhouse, South Yorkshire.

A descendant of the 1st Earl of Strafford, Lord Rockingham was the second son of Thomas Watson-Wentworth, 1st Baron Malton (1st Earl of Malton from 1734) and the former Lady Mary Finch, daughter of the 7th Earl of Winchilsea. He was brought up at the family's lavish home of Wentworth Woodhouse near Rotherham in Yorkshire, and became Viscount Higham on his elder brother's death in 1739.

He was educated at Westminster School. During the Jacobite rising of 1745, his father, Lord Malton, made him a colonel and organised volunteers to defend the country against the "Young Pretender". Lord Higham's sister Mary wrote to him from London, saying the King "did not doubt but that you was as good a colonel as he has in his army" and his other sister Charlotte wrote that "you have gained immortal honour and I have every day the satisfaction of hearing twenty handsome things said of the Blues and their Collonel".

The march of the Jacobite army into northern England caused the Wentworth household to flee to Doncaster and Higham rode from Wentworth to Carlisle to join the Duke of Cumberland in pursuit of the "Young Pretender". He did this without parental consent and Cumberland wrote to Lord Malton, saying that his "zeal on this occasion shows the same principles fix't that you yourself have given such strong proofs of". Higham wrote to his father that Cumberland "blamed me for my disobedience, yet as I came with a design of saving my King and country...it greatly palliated my offence". Higham's mother wrote to his father: "Though I hope you won't tell it him, never any thing met with such general applause, in short he is the hero of these times, and his Majesty talks of this young Subject, in such terms, as must please you to hear...in the Drawing Room no two people talk together, but he makes part of the discourse".

=== Lordships and titles ===
In April 1746, his father was created Marquess of Rockingham and he himself assumed the courtesy title Earl of Malton. These honours came about due to the patronage of Henry Pelham. At this time the new Lord Malton was travelling across Europe under the tutorship of George Quarme, as his father had decided against sending him to Cambridge.

During his stay in Rome, Malton noted that amongst Englishmen, the Whigs outnumbered the Jacobites four-to-one and there were "no Persons of rank about the Pretender". He also noted that "the vile spirit of Jacobitism" was greatly declining. When in Herrenhausen, Hanover, he met George II of Great Britain and made an impression: the King told Malton's uncle Henry Finch that he had never seen a finer or a more promising youth. In September 1750, two months before his father's death, he was raised to the Peerage of Ireland in his own right as Baron Malton and Earl Malton.

== Early political career: 1751–1765 ==
=== Member of Parliament ===
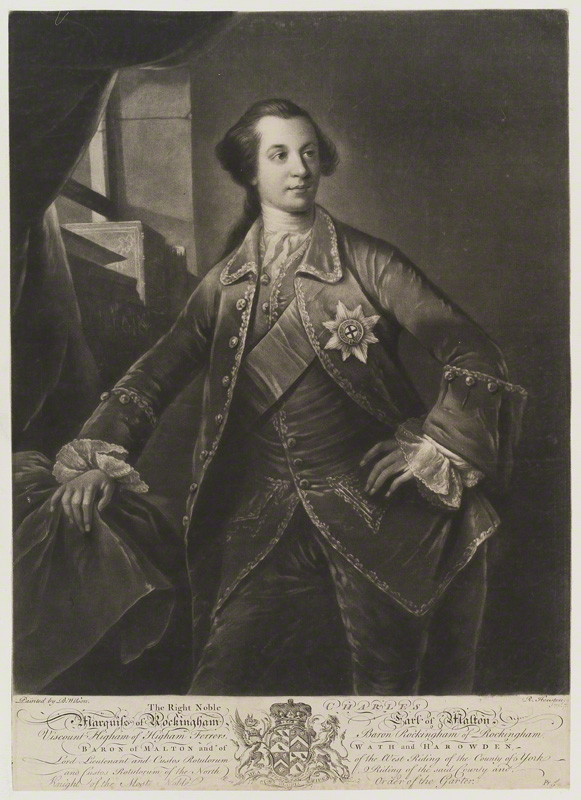
A young Rockingham

On 13 May 1751 (his 21st birthday), Rockingham inherited his father's estates. The rents from the land in Yorkshire, Northamptonshire and Ireland gave him an annual income of £20,000 (equivalent to £3,900,000 in 2025). He also controlled both of the borough parliamentary seats of Malton and one seat for the single-member borough of Higham Ferrers (Northants), along with twenty-three livings and five chaplaincies in the church. In July he was appointed Lord Lieutenant and custos rotulorum of the West Riding in Yorkshire, Lord Lieutenant of York city, and custos rotulorum of York city and county. In 1751–52 Rockingham joined White's, the Jockey Club and the Royal Society.

Rockingham's maiden speech was on 17 March 1752 in support of the bill which disposed of Scottish lands confiscated in the aftermath of the Jacobite rising of 1745. He wanted the lands cultivated by people "employed in husbandry & handicrafts" who repudiated "plunder, rapine & rebellion". He said "the highlanders have remained in their ancient state, prolific, bold, idle, & consequently hives of rebellion". He compared his favoured policy with the policy which his ancestor Lord Strafford had used in Ireland. Rockingham's speech was not well received, with Horace Walpole criticising him for venturing into "a debate so much above his force". Rockingham's uncle William Murray, the Solicitor-General, believed him to be poorly educated, so he employed Quarme as Rockingham's tutor again. Rockingham was for four months to study Demosthenes for oratory, and to learn the histories of the Assyrian, Persian, Greek and Roman empires along with modern history. Murray wanted Rockingham to take after Sir Walter Raleigh.

=== Lord of the Bedchamber ===
In 1752, Rockingham was appointed Lord of the Bedchamber to George II and married Mary Bright (1735–1804). In 1753 the Rockingham Club was formed, containing the first Rockingham Whigs. Rockingham hired James Stuart, of whom he was a patron, to paint portraits of William III and George II for the club rooms. The club held monthly meetings and a list written in June 1754 showed it had 133 members. In 1755 the King appointed him to the honorary office of Vice Admiral of the North. During a French invasion scare in 1756 Rockingham raised a volunteer militia at his own expense and when rioting broke out against Army enlistments Rockingham restored order without the use of military force in Sheffield. The Secretary at War, Lord Barrington, wrote to him: "You are the only instance of a Lord lieutenant's exerting the civil authority upon these occasions". Rockingham asked in 1760 to be made a knight of the Order of the Garter and the King consented.

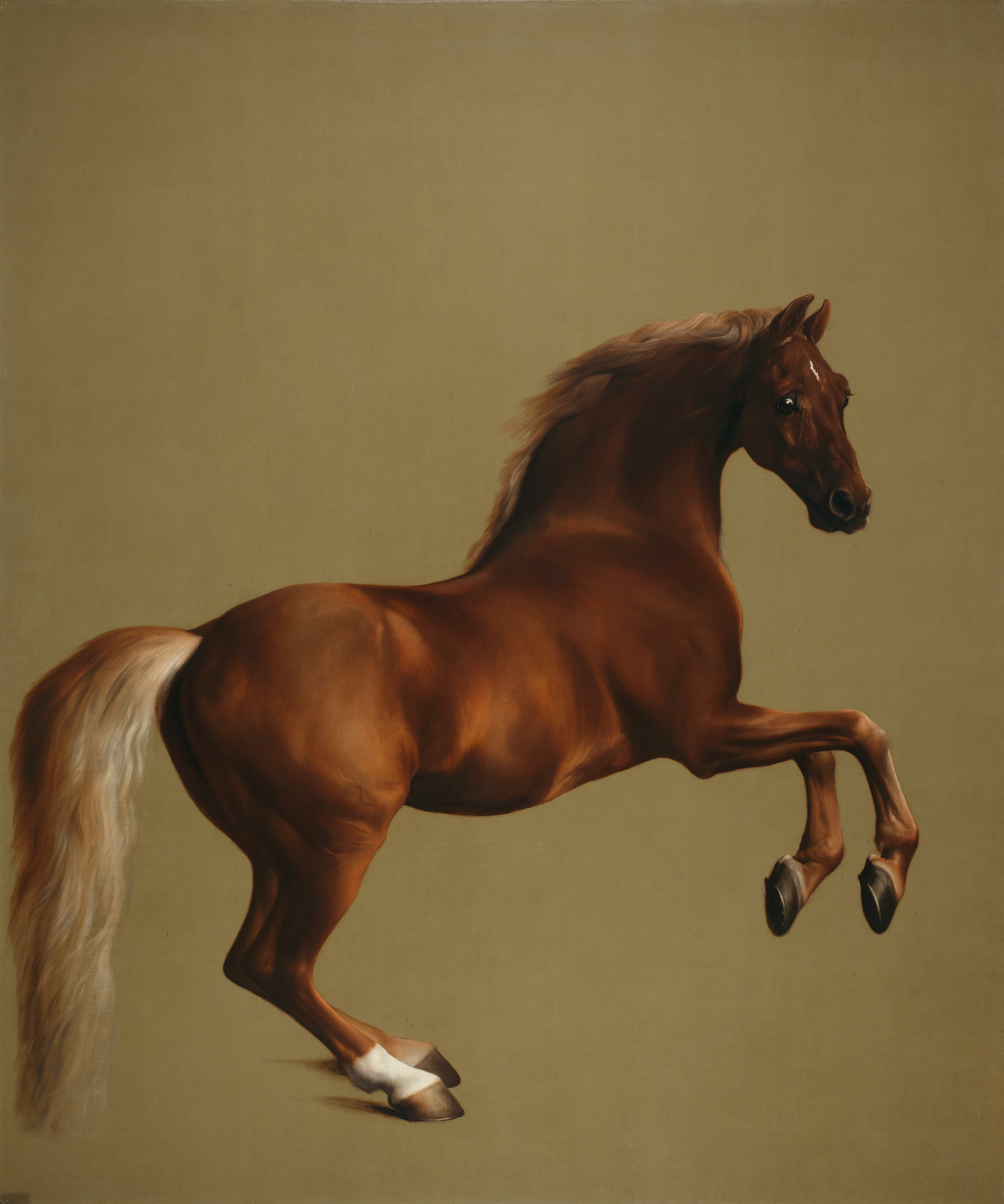
Rockinham's horse Whistlejacket by George Stubbs, c. 1762, 292 cm high, National Gallery, London

In 1760, George II died, and his grandson ascended the throne as George III. Rockingham was allied to the Duke of Newcastle and his supporters, whilst the new King had a favourite in Lord Bute. Rockingham believed that Bute and his supporters wanted to take "the whole Administration & Government of this country into their hands" and wanted Newcastle to resign now before he would be inevitably disposed of. Rockingham believed that the revolution in British politics since George III's accession was harmful to the country, since it removed the Whigs from their ascendancy which had settled the constitution and secured the House of Hanover on the British throne. Rockingham wrote to Newcastle:

...without flattery to your Grace, I must look and ever shall upon you and your connections as the solid foundations on which every good which has happened to this country since the [Glorious] Revolution, have been erected. ... What a medley of government is probably soon to take place & when it does what an alarm will ensue!

Rockingham resigned as Lord of the Bedchamber on 3 November 1762 in protest at the King's policies and other Whigs associated with the Duke of Newcastle did the same. The next month the King removed Rockingham from the office of Lord Lieutenant of the West Riding, Lord Lieutenant of the city and county of York, as custos rotulorum of the North and West Riding, as custos rotulorum of the city and county of York and as Vice Admiral of York and county.

Over the next several years, Rockingham gradually became the leader of those of Newcastle's supporters who were unwilling to reconcile themselves to the premierships of Bute and his successor, George Grenville.

== Prime Minister: 1765–1766 ==
=== Appointment ===
The king's dislike, as well as Grenville's general lack of parliamentary support, led to his dismissal in 1765, and, following negotiations conducted through the medium of the king's uncle, the Duke of Cumberland, Lord Rockingham was appointed prime minister. Rockingham recovered the honours of which he had been deprived in 1762. Rockingham appointed his allies Henry Seymour Conway and the Duke of Grafton as secretaries of state. Also at this time, Edmund Burke, the Irish statesman and philosopher, became his private secretary and would remain a lifelong friend, political ally and advisor until Rockingham's death from influenza in 1782.

=== Resignation ===
Rockingham's administration was dominated by the American issue. Rockingham sought the repeal of the Stamp Act 1765 for political reasons not on principle, as it was roiling the American colonies. He won a Commons vote on the repeal resolution by 275 to 167 in 1766. However Rockingham also passed the Declaratory Act, which stated that the British Parliament had the right to legislate for the American colonies in all cases whatsoever. His attitude about colonial relations was direct: "I shall always consider that this country, as the parent, ought to be tender and just; and that the colonies, as children, ought to be dutiful."

Internal dissent within the cabinet led to his resignation and the appointment of Lord Chatham as prime minister (the Duke of Grafton was appointed First Lord of the Treasury, one of the few cases in which those two offices were separate).

== Opposition: 1766–1782 ==
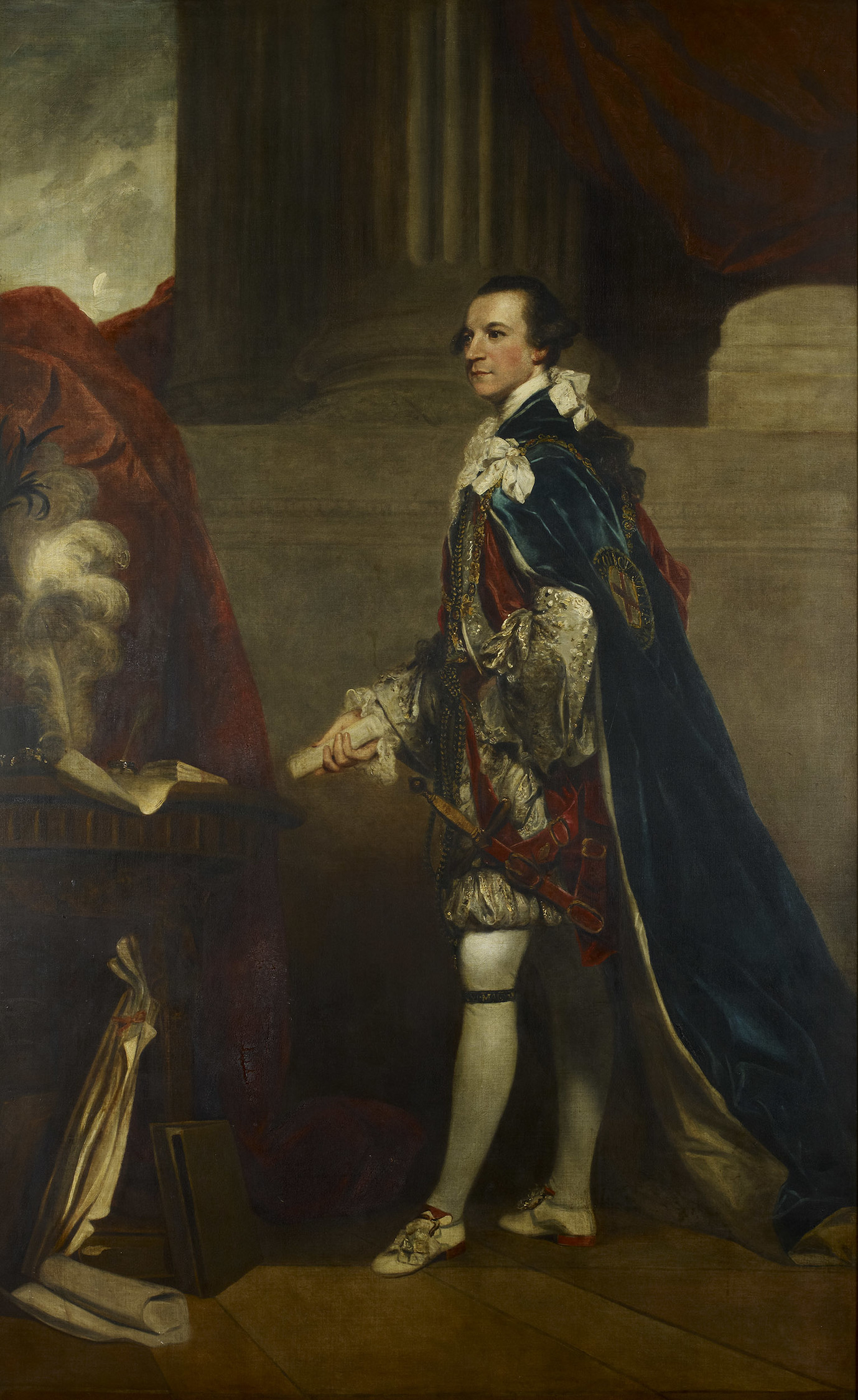
Lord Rockingham painted by Joshua Reynolds in 1768

Rockingham spent the next sixteen years in opposition. He was a keen supporter of constitutional rights for colonists.

Rockingham wrote to Edmund Burke on 14 February 1771: "I fear indeed the future struggles of the people in defence of their Constitutional Rights will grow weaker and weaker. It is much too probable that the power and influence of the Crown will increase rapidly. We live at the period when for the first time since the Revolution, the power and influence of the Crown is held out, as the main and chief and only support of Government. If we...do not exert now, we may accelerate the abject state to which the Constitution may be reduced". On 24 May 1771 Benjamin Franklin arrived from the Rectory of Thornhill, where he had stayed with the Rev. John Michell, vicar to Rockingham's kinsman, fellow leading politician and keen advocate of colonists' rights Sir George Savile. Rockingham wrote to Augustus Keppel on 3 November 1779, saying that he believed the war against America could not be won, that the government was corrupt but not unpopular, and that the longer this continued the greater the danger to the liberties and the constitution of Britain: "Perhaps a total change of men and measures, & system in the Government: of this country might have effect on the councils of some foreign countries...who might think that it was no longer a Court system to combat, but that the whole nation would unite & make the utmost efforts".

Rockingham was recruited to hunt down the Cragg Vale Coiners. He had thirty Coiners arrested by Christmas Day 1769.

== Prime Minister: 1782 ==
In 1782 he was appointed prime minister for a second time (with Charles James Fox and Lord Shelburne as Secretaries of State) and, upon taking office, pushed for an acknowledgement of the independence of the United States, initiating an end to British involvement in the American War of Independence.

Due to rising unemployment, in this second premiership, Rockingham's administration saw the passage of Gilbert's Act, the Relief of the Poor Act 1782, after 17 years of opposing Thomas Gilbert's ideas, this saw the creation of unions of civil parishes, later officially called unions under Gilbert's Act, to provide outdoor relief and set up workhouses.

Paul Langford has asserted that the Rockingham administration "represented a landmark in constitutional history. The ministerial changes of 1782 involved a more extensive upheaval among office-holders than any since 1714, virtually replacing one administration with another drawn from opposition".

=== Death ===
Rockingham's second term was short-lived, for Lord Rockingham died fourteen weeks later at the beginning of July from an influenza epidemic. He was replaced as prime minister by Lord Shelburne, who was more reluctant to accept the total independence of America and proposed a form of Dominion status, but by April 1783 he succeeded in securing peace with America and this feat remains his legacy.

Rockingham was buried in the Strafford family vault in York Minster in Yorkshire.

== Outside politics ==
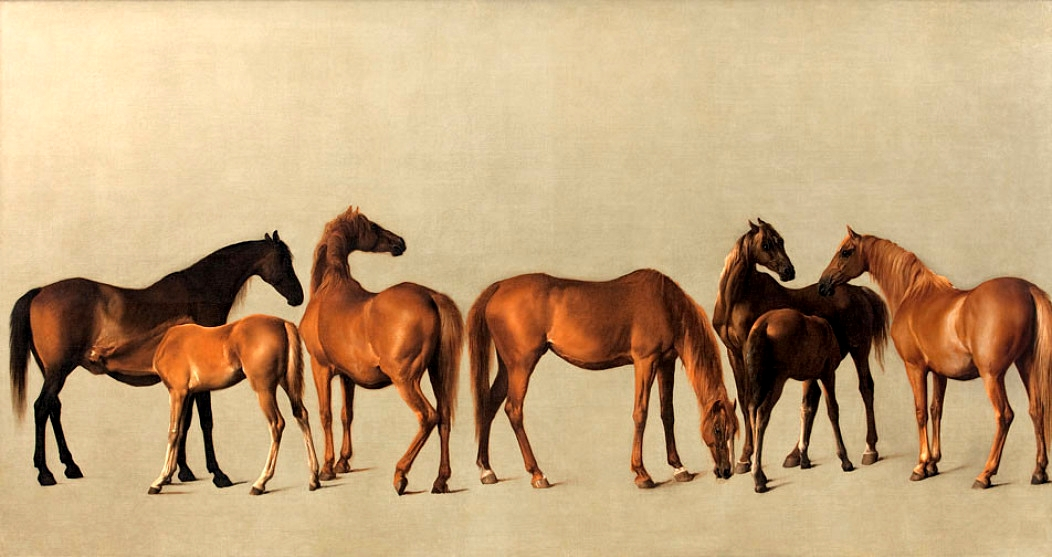
Mares and Foals without a background, other Rockingham horses painted by Stubbs on his visit in 1762. Whistlejacket was in the pair piece showing stallions.

Rockingham was exceptionally rich even by the standards of Whig magnates. He was a collector of art, commissioning several works in Italy on his Grand Tour in the late 1740s, but his great leisure interests were, typically for his class, horseracing and gambling. His wife wrote of her hopes that he would restrict himself to gambling "just upon the turf, for there is always a possibility of some sort of pleasure in that; but not the smallest in other sorts".

Wentworth House, as it was then known, had been "rebuilt by his father on a huge scale" and empty walls needed filling. In 1762 he commissioned George Stubbs, the leading equine painter, to produce a series of portraits of his horses, one of which was Whistlejacket, whose portrait is the largest and best-known of the group.

One story accounting for the unusual size and composition of Whistlejacket was that Rockingham had intended to commission an equestrian portrait of George III; Stubbs would paint the horse while two other notable portrait and landscape painters would fill in the King and the landscape respectively. In one account, The painting was supposedly intended to accompany a similarly sized equestrian portrait of George II by David Morier, but Rockingham then changed his mind. According to Horace Walpole, on a visit to Wentworth in 1766, where he was probably shown round by the housekeeper, the painting was intended as a gift for the King, but Rockingham supposedly had not bothered to support progress of the painting after falling out of favour, and ordered it hung at Wentworth Woodhouse uncompleted instead. This is not generally given much credence by art historians.

Horace Walpole on his visit in 1766 complained of the un-landscaped park "This lord loves nothing but horses, and the enclosures for them take place of everything".

For sculpture, he made use of Joseph Nollekens, the leading British sculptor of the day. A large marble Diana, now in the Victoria and Albert Museum, was made for Wentworth Woodhouse about 1778, although it did not reach the house before Rockingham's death. But all the portraits sculpted by Nollekens may be posthumous. A "marble statue by Joseph Nollekens, in peer’s robes with Garter collar" stands as his monument in the Wentworth Woodhouse mausoleum. This was erected by his nephew, apparently using a death mask. Nollekens also created two types of bust, several copies of which were made, and some remain in the collections of the great Whig houses of the time.

== Legacy ==
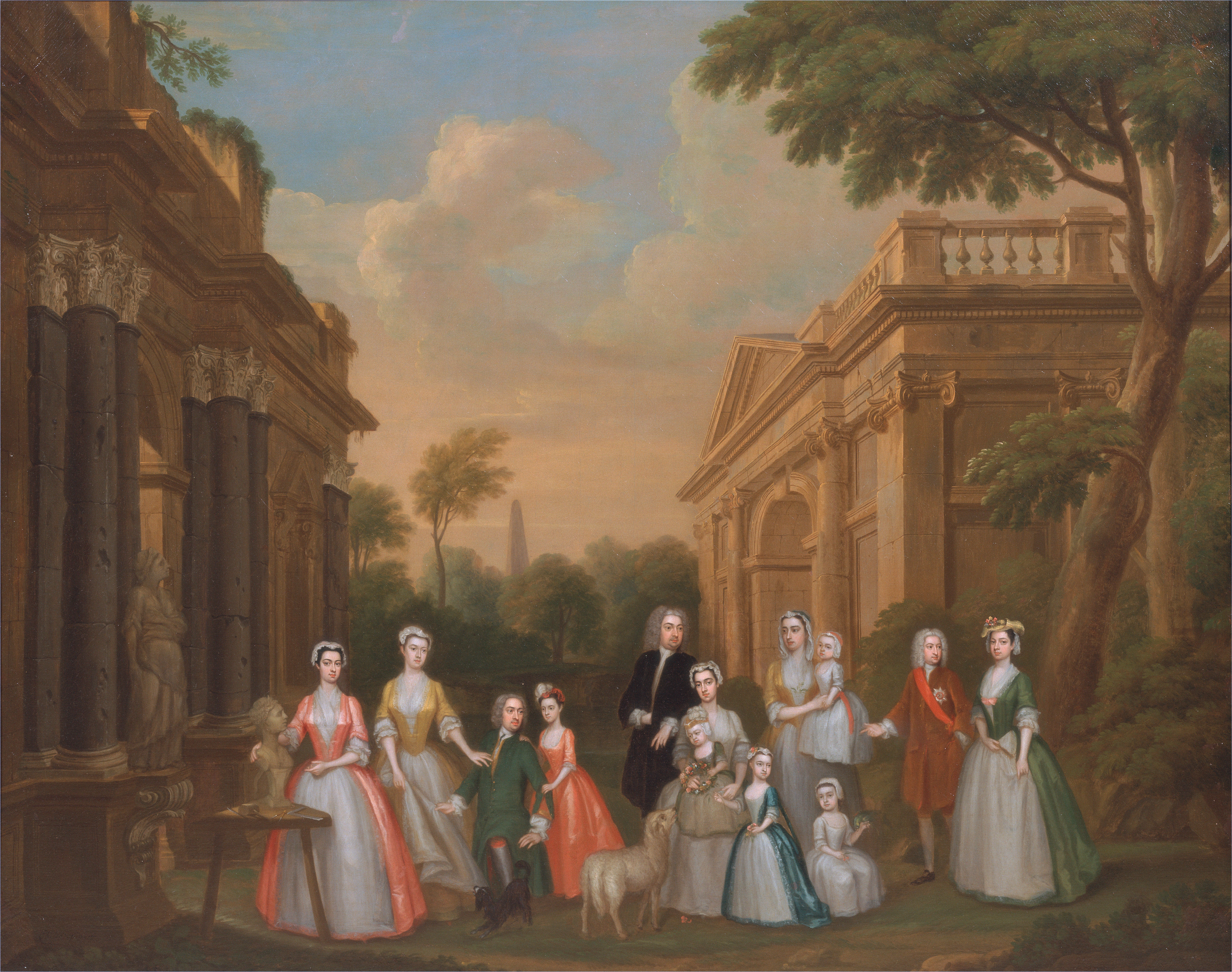
Rockingham as a toddler, on his mother's lap amid his relations, c. 1732, by Charles Philips. He later wrote on the back asking that his nephew hang the painting.

Rockingham's estates, but not his marquessate, passed to his nephew William Fitzwilliam, 4th Earl Fitzwilliam. Burke wrote to Fitzwilliam on 3 July 1782: "You are Lord Rockingham in every thing. ... I have no doubt that you will take it in good part, that his old friends, who were attached to him by every tie of affection, and of principle, and among others myself, should look to you, and should not think it an act of forwardness and intrusion to offer you their services". On 7 July 150 supporters of Rockingham met at Fitzwilliam's house and decided to withdraw support for Lord Shelburne's administration. The old Rockingham party fragmented, with Fox and the Duke of Portland leading a coalition of Whigs. The Whig party further split over the French Revolution, with Burke writing to Fitzwilliam on 4 January 1797: "As to our old friends, they are so many individuals, not a jot more separated from your Lordship, than they are from one another. There is no mutual affection, communication, or concert between them".

The Whig historian Thomas Babington Macaulay was an admirer of Rockingham and his Whig faction:

They were men worthy to have charged by the side of Hampden at Chalgrove, or to have exchanged the last embrace with Russell on the scaffold in Lincoln's Inn Fields. They carried into politics the same high principles of virtue which regulated their private dealings, nor would they stoop to promote even the noblest and most salutary ends by means which honour and probity condemn. Such men were Lord John Cavendish, Sir George Savile, and others whom we hold in honour as the second founders of the Whig party, as the restorers of its pristine health and energy after half a century of degeneracy. The chief of this respectable band was the Marquess of Rockingham, a man of splendid fortune, excellent sense, and stainless character. He was indeed nervous to such a degree that, to the very close of his life, he never rose without great reluctance and embarrassment to address the House of Lords. But, though not a great orator, he had in a high degree some of the qualities of a statesman. He chose his friends well; and he had, in an extraordinary degree, the art of attaching them to him by ties of the most honourable kind. The cheerful fidelity with which they adhered to him through many years of almost hopeless opposition was less admirable than the disinterestedness and delicacy which they showed when he rose to power.

=== Places named after Lord Rockingham ===
Canada

- Rockingham, Nova Scotia

United States

- Rockingham County, New Hampshire
- Rockingham County, North Carolina
- Rockingham County, Virginia
- Rockingham, Vermont
- Rockingham, North Carolina
- Wentworth, North Carolina

== Cabinets of Lord Rockingham ==
=== 1765–1766 ===
Portfolio	Minister	Took office	Left office
First Lord of the Treasury; Leader of the House of Lords	Charles Watson-Wentworth, 2nd Marquess of Rockingham (head of ministry)	13 July 1765	30 July 1766
Lord Chancellor	Robert Henley, 1st Earl of Northington	16 January 1761	30 July 1766
Lord President of the Council	Daniel Finch, 8th Earl of Winchilsea	12 July 1765	30 July 1766
Lord Privy Seal	Thomas Pelham-Holles, 1st Duke of Newcastle	30 July 1765	30 July 1766
Chancellor of the Exchequer	William Dowdeswell	16 July 1765	2 August 1766
Secretary of State for the Northern Department	Augustus FitzRoy, 3rd Duke of Grafton	12 July 1765	14 May 1766
Secretary of State for the Northern Department	Henry Seymour Conway	23 May 1766	20 January 1768
Secretary of State for the Southern Department; Leader of the House of Commons	Henry Seymour Conway	12 July 1765	23 May 1766
Secretary of State for the Southern Department	Charles Lennox, 3rd Duke of Richmond	23 May 1766	29 July 1766
First Lord of the Admiralty	John Perceval, 2nd Earl of Egmont	1763	1766
Master-General of the Ordnance	John Manners, Marquess of Granby	1763	1770
Minister without Portfolio	Prince William, Duke of Cumberland	1765	31 October 1765

=== 1782 ===
Portfolio	Minister	Took office	Left office
First Lord of the Treasury	Charles Watson-Wentworth, 2nd Marquess of Rockingham (head of ministry)	27 March 1782	1 July 1782
Lord Chancellor	Edward Thurlow, 1st Baron Thurlow	3 June 1778	7 April 1783
Lord President of the Council	Charles Pratt, 1st Baron Camden	27 March 1782	2 April 1783
Lord Privy Seal	Augustus FitzRoy, 3rd Duke of Grafton	1782	1783
Chancellor of the Exchequer	Lord John Cavendish	27 March 1782	10 July 1782
Secretary of State for the Home Department; Leader of the House of Lords	William Petty, 2nd Earl of Shelburne	27 March 1782	10 July 1782
Secretary of State for Foreign Affairs; Leader of the House of Commons	Charles James Fox	27 March 1782	5 July 1782
First Lord of the Admiralty	Augustus Keppel, 1st Viscount Keppel	1782	1783
Chancellor of the Duchy of Lancaster	John Dunning, 1st Baron Ashburton	17 April 1782	29 August 1783
Master-General of the Ordnance	Charles Lennox, 3rd Duke of Richmond	1782	1783
Commander-in-Chief of the Forces	Henry Seymour Conway	1782	1783

== Titles ==
- The Hon. Charles Watson-Wentworth (1730–1733)
- Viscount Higham (1733–1746)
- Earl of Malton (1746–1750)
- The Rt. Hon. The Earl Malton (1750–1750)
- The Most Hon. The Marquess of Rockingham (1750–1751)
- The Most Hon. The Marquess of Rockingham, FRS (1751–1761)
- The Most Hon. The Marquess of Rockingham, KG, FRS (1761–1765)
- The Most Hon. The Marquess of Rockingham, KG, PC, FRS (1765–1782)

== Ancestry ==
Ancestors of Charles Watson-Wentworth, 2nd Marquess of Rockingham

8. Edward Watson, 2nd Baron Rockingham
4. Hon. Thomas Watson
9. Lady Anne Wentworth
2. Thomas Watson-Wentworth, 1st Marquess of Rockingham
10. Sir Thomas Proby, 1st Baronet, of Elton and Rans
5. Alice Proby
11. Frances Cotton
1. Charles Watson-Wentworth, 2nd Marquess of Rockingham
12. Heneage Finch, 1st Earl of Nottingham
6. Daniel Finch, 2nd Earl of Nottingham
13. Elizabeth Harvey
3. Lady Mary Finch
14. Christopher Hatton, 1st Viscount Hatton
7. Hon. Anne Hatton
15. Frances Yelverton

== Arms ==
Coat of arms of Charles Watson-Wentworth, 2nd Marquess of Rockingham
Coronet A Coronet of a Marquess Crest A griffin passant, wings elevated argent, beaked, forlegged and ducally gorged or. Escutcheon Quarterly : Quarterly : 1st and 4th Argent, on a chevron engrailed azure between three martlets sable, as many crescents or, (Watson); 2nd and 3rd Sable, a chevron between three leopards' heads or (Wentworth). Supporters Dexter: A griffin argent, beaked and forlegged gules, collared vairé ermine and azure; Sinister: A lion or, collared vairé and ermine. Motto Mea gloria fides (Trust is my renown). Orders The Most Noble Order of the Garter - Knight Companion (KG)

Court offices
New appointments on the accession of George III	Lord of the Bedchamber; 1760–1762	Succeeded by The Duke of Manchester
Political offices
Preceded by George Grenville	Prime Minister of Great Britain; 13 July 1765 – 30 July 1766	Succeeded by William Pitt the Elder
Preceded by The Earl of Halifax	Leader of the House of Lords; 1765–1766	Succeeded by The Duke of Grafton
Preceded by Lord North	Prime Minister of Great Britain; 27 March 1782 – 1 July 1782	Succeeded by The Earl of Shelburne
Honorary titles
Preceded by The Marquess of Rockingham	Custos Rotulorum of the North Riding of Yorkshire; 1751–1762	Succeeded by The Earl of Holderness
Preceded by The Marquess of Rockingham	Lord Lieutenant of the West Riding of Yorkshire; 1751–1763	Succeeded by The Earl of Huntingdon
Preceded by Sir Conyers Darcy as Vice-Admiral of the North Riding	Vice-Admiral of Yorkshire; 1755–1763	Succeeded by The Earl of Holderness
Preceded by The Viscount of Irvine as Vice-Admiral of the East Riding	Vice-Admiral of Yorkshire; 1755–1763	Succeeded by The Earl of Holderness
Preceded by The Earl of Huntingdon	Lord Lieutenant of the West Riding of Yorkshire; 1765–1782	Succeeded by Earl of Surrey
Preceded by The Earl of Holderness	Custos Rotulorum of the North Riding of Yorkshire; 1765–1782	Succeeded by The Earl Fauconberg
Preceded by The Earl of Holderness	Vice-Admiral of Yorkshire; 1776–1782	Vacant Title next held by The Duke of Leeds
Peerage of Great Britain
Preceded by Thomas Watson-Wentworth	Marquess of Rockingham; 1750–1782	Extinct
Peerage of Ireland
New creation	Earl Malton; 1750–1782	Extinct
