= Mess =

Place where military personnel eat and socialize

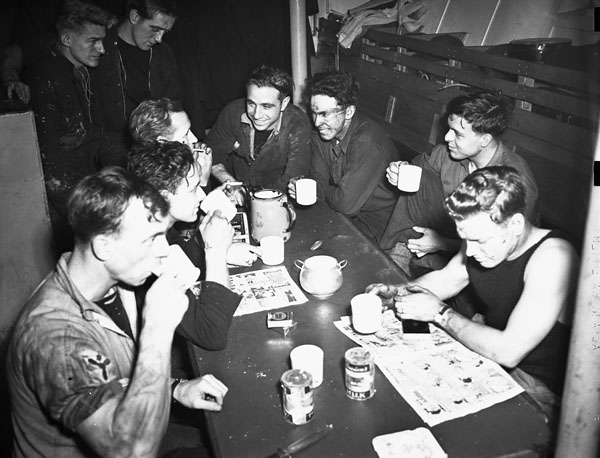
Stand easy in the stoker's mess of the corvette HMCS Kamsack, 1943

A mess, also called a mess deck aboard ships and also a mess hall, is a designated area where military personnel eat, socialize, and (in some cases) live. The term is also used to indicate the groups of military personnel who belong to separate messes, such as the officers' mess, the chief petty officers' mess, and the enlisted mess. In some civilian societies this military usage has been extended to the eating arrangements of other disciplined services such as fire fighting and police forces.

The word derives from the Old French mes, "serving of food" (cf. modern French mets), which itself derives from Latin missus, "sending".

== Canada ==
Messing in the Canadian Armed Forces generally follows the British model (see United Kingdom below), from which most traditions have descended. Basic regulations regarding the establishment and administration of messes is contained in the King's Regulations and Orders and the Canadian Forces Administrative Orders.

As in the British Forces, there are normally three messes: the officers' mess (called the wardroom in naval establishments), for commissioned officers and officer cadets; the warrant officers' and sergeants' mess (Navy: chiefs' and petty officers' mess), for senior non-commissioned officers and warrant officers; and the junior ranks mess, for junior non-commissioned officers, privates, and seamen. Some bases, such as CFB Kingston in the 1980s, had a master corporals' mess separate from the junior ranks'; all of these, with the exception of the CFB Valcartier master corporals' mess (known as the Mess des chefs), have been amalgamated with the junior ranks' messes. Certain other bases, mainly training establishments such as HMCS Venture have messes known as the gun room for the use of subordinate officers (naval or officer cadets).

Most bases and stations have three messes (officers', warrant officers' and sergeants', and junior ranks'). Many of these establishments have lodger units (such as air squadrons, army regiments, etc.) who also have their own messes. All of His Majesty's Canadian ships have three messes aboard; this extends to Naval Reserve divisions and other naval shore establishments which bear the title HMCS (see stone frigate). Due to limited budgets and declining revenues, many messes have been forced to close or amalgamate: for example, at CFS St. John's, the junior ranks' mess of the Newfoundland Militia District closed, its members moving to the station's junior ranks'; the station's officers' mess and warrant officers' and sergeants' mess later amalgamated.

Headdress is not worn in Canadian messes, except:

- by personnel on duty, such as a duty or watch officer, or the military police;
- as permitted on special occasions, such as during costume parties, theme events, etc.;
- by personnel for whom wearing headgear is mandatory (e.g. for religious reasons).

All Canadian Forces personnel, regular and reserve, must belong to a mess, and are termed ordinary members of their particular mess. Although normally on federal property, messes have been ordered to comply with the legal drinking age laws of their province; for example, an 18-year-old soldier may legally consume alcohol in a Quebec mess, but not in one in Ontario, where the legal age is 19 years. However, despite being underage, the soldier may not be prohibited entry into the mess.

Canadian Forces personnel are normally welcome in any mess of their appropriate rank group, regardless of element; thus a regimental sergeant-major of an infantry battalion is welcome in a chiefs' and petty officers' mess (inter-service rivalries notwithstanding). Personnel of a different rank (except as noted below) must ask for permission to enter; that may be granted by the president of the mess committee, his designate, or the senior member present.

These restrictions are normally waived on certain special occasions, when the messes are "opened" to all personnel, regardless of rank. These occasions may include (and will be locally published by the mess committee)::

- New Year's Day, January 1, called a levée
- Canada Day, July 1
- Remembrance Day, November 11

The commanding officer of the establishment or unit that owns the mess is permitted access to all his messes; thus a ship's captain has access to the vessel's chiefs' and petty officers' mess, the commanding officer of a regiment may enter any of the regimental messes, and the base commander is welcome in any of the base's messes. In practice, commanding officers rarely enter anything other than the officers' mess unless invited, as a point of etiquette. In addition, duty personnel — such as a duty NCO or officer of the watch — or the military police have access to any and all messes for the purposes of maintaining good order and discipline. Chaplains are usually welcomed in all messes.

As in the UK, Canadian messes are run by the mess committee, a group democratically elected by the members of the mess. One exception is on warships, where the president of the junior ranks mess is appointed by the commanding officer. The committee members are generally the same as those of their British counterparts, with the addition of special representatives for such things as sports, housing, morale, etc. These positions are normally spelled out in the mess constitution, which sets out the bylaws, regulations, and guidelines for such things as conduct of mess meetings, associate memberships, dress regulations within the mess, or booking of the mess by civilian organizations. The constitution and any amendments are voted upon by the members of the mess.

== Germany ==
The Federal German Armed Forces (Bundeswehr) differentiates between three different mess areas.

1. HBG (Heimbetriebsgesellschaft) – more commonly called Enlisted Mess (Mannschaftsheim): it is common for most bases to have one, where food and drink can be purchased. Newspapers and in some cases equipment and souvenirs such as key chains may also be available. There is generally no strict regulation of conduct, even though access is not limited to enlisted personnel, and NCOs or officers may also be present, ensuring some regulation of conduct.
2. UHG (Unteroffizierheim or Unteroffizierheimgesellschaft) (Gesellschaft lit. society) – also called UK (NCO Comradeship/Unteroffizierkameradschaft) – Non-commissioned Officers' Mess: this is the area where NCOs can dine or spend their evenings. As opposed to the HBG, the UHG has a constitution, bylaws and a board. Access is usually restricted to NCOs, while officers can gain entry, even though it is usually frowned upon by the NCOs. Some bases have a joint NCOs' and Officers' Mess.
3. OHG (Officers' Mess/Offizierheimgesellschaft) – Also called Casino (Kasino or Offizierkasino). Much like the UHG, the Kasino also has a constitution, bylaws and a board. Gentlemanly conduct is mandatory: for instance upon entering the main hall, officers are expected to stand at attention and perform a small bow. Additionally, veterans' meetings are usually held either in a UHG or in a Kasino. As with the UHG, Kasinos have permanent personnel, as a general rule enlisted men, called Ordonnanzen, a military term for waiter or barman. Some Kasinos have grand pianos, and hold recitals, as well as having music played during luncheons or dinners. Official events such as balls and unofficial events such as weddings, informational events and the like, are held here.

The German Navy call their messes Messen, with the distinction Offiziermesse. The land-based messes are also called Offiziermessen.

== India ==
Kota House Officer's Mess of Indian Navy, 2017

The Indian Army follows a system similar to the British. A typical regiment/unit would have one mess and two clubs: a mess for the commissioned officers, a club for the Junior Commissioned Officers (JCO) and a club for the NCOs. Havildars/Daffadars (equivalent to Sergeants) are considered to be NCOs. The Air Force, however has an SNCO (Sr. NCO) mess for Warrant Officers and sergeants, while lower-ranking NCOs would be members of the NCOs' mess.

In the officers' mess and the JCO's club, there is also the rank of Mess Havildar. A Mess Havildar is a senior NCO who manages and executes the day-to-day activities of the mess/club.

On Republic Day (Jan 26), the JCOs are formally invited for cocktails at the Officers' mess. This is reciprocated on Independence Day (Aug 15) by the JCOs at the JCOs Club.

The term mess (short for mess halls) is also used for common eating places e.g: University dining halls and South Indian restaurants that serve meals.

== Israel ==
In the Israeli Navy, although Hebrew speaking, dining rooms on missile ships, Dolphin submarines, and the kitchen in the patrol boats are named Messes, Crew Mess and Officers' Mess. Also, every special meal brought by a crewmember, like celebrating a birthday or a rank promotion, is called Mess.

== United Kingdom ==
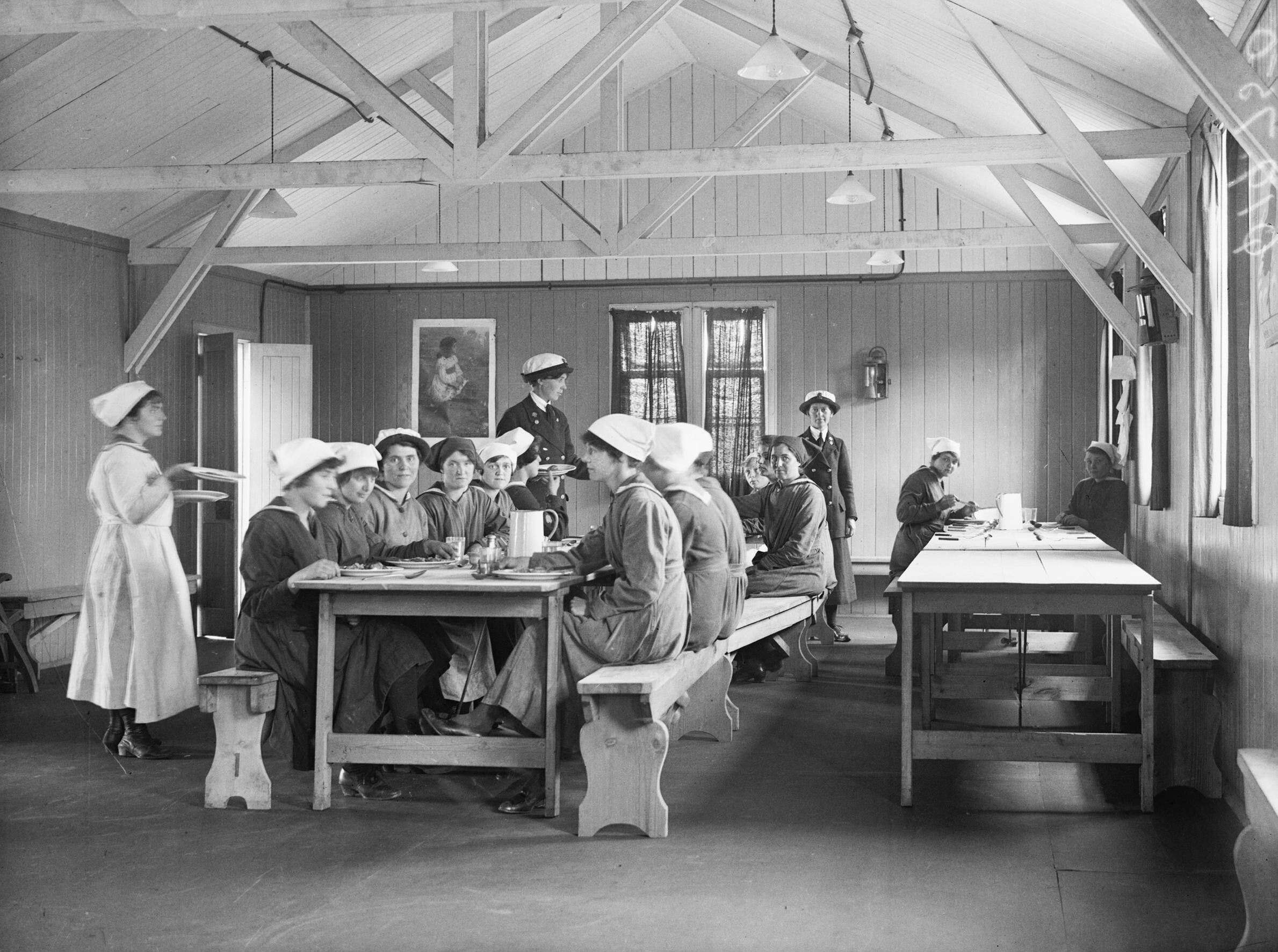
Ratings are served dinner in their mess room at the Women's Royal Naval Service base on Osea Island, England, during the First World War.

On a naval or military establishment there are usually two or three messes:

- The Officers' Mess, for Commissioned Officers (and Officer Cadets);
- The Chief Petty Officer's or Warrant Officers' and Sergeants' Mess, for Senior Non-Commissioned Officers (SNCOs) and Warrant Officers (WOs);
- The Junior Rates' or Junior Ranks Mess, for Junior NCOs, Rates, Airmen and Privates.

Officers and SNCOs are required under King's Regulations to be a member of a mess and unmarried members usually live, eat, and socialise in them. Members of the Officers’ and SNCO mess are also required to pay a subscription fee for supplies and upkeep. The amount is decided upon by the commanding officer within the limits stipulated by the Regulations.

Soldiers, sailors or airmen are welcome in any mess for their rank or equivalent, should they be away from their home unit, as long as they are paying dues in at least one mess. For the Warrant Officers' and Sergeants' Mess the highest ranking (normally the regimental sergeant major) member is known as the Presiding Member.

A mess is run by the Mess Committee, a group democratically elected by the members of the mess (except wardrooms), but normally agreed by the commanding officer or regimental sergeant major.

1. President Mess Committee (PMC) - (Officers' Mess) or Chairman of the Mess Committee (Sergeants'/Petty Officers' Mess)
2. Vice President of the Mess Committee (Mr Vice), who is responsible for toasts during mess dinners. He or she is rarely the deputy of the PMC (normally this function is carried out by the Secretary) but instead the most junior person in the mess.
3. Secretary (Sec), who handles the administration of the committee whose purview usually also includes handling correspondence on behalf of the mess and keeping records and minutes of mess meetings, updating documentation and involvement with the arrangements and logistics for mess events.
4. Treasurer, who handles the financial affairs/records of the mess, where there is a member of the mess who runs the pay/accounts office of the unit, they would usually be appointed to this role and carry out the duties of treasurer.
5. Wines Member, who is responsible for keeping the bar stocked.
6. House/Properties Member, who is responsible for furniture and infrastructure.
7. Entertainments (Ents) Member, who is typically responsible for formulating the social calendar and promoting special events or parties in the mess, as-well as coordinating social events as directed by the Mess Committee.

Some messes also have a Senior Living-In Member (SLIM) who represents the living-in members and supervises their conduct.

The commanding officer of the unit has right of veto over the mess, and any changes or events must have his approval. The CO is allowed into any mess (because they are legally all his), but it is often considered an abuse of power, unbecoming conduct or disturbing the order for a CO to drink in a lower rank mess, except when invited on special occasions.

The Officers' Mess in a Royal Navy ship or base is called the wardroom. Associated with the wardroom is a gunroom, the mess for midshipmen and occasionally junior sub-lieutenants. The captain of a vessel is not normally a member of the wardroom, which is always run by the first lieutenant or executive officer (XO), thereby known as the Mess President ("Mess Prez"). This post is part of the job of being a ship's XO. Other committee members are generally appointed (voluntarily or otherwise) by the XO.

Mess dress is the military term for the formal evening dress worn in the mess or at other formal occasions. It is also known as mess kit. Mess dress would be worn at occasions requiring white tie or black tie.

== United States ==
=== U.S. Army ===
In the United States Army, officers historically have had to purchase their own food using funds allocated to each officer. In the far-flung forts of the American Old West, officers would organize their food service in two ways:

- "Closed Mess" was when the few officers of a small fort would pool all of their food funds to provide all meals to members only, thus being "closed" to outsiders except as guests.
- In a larger post, the larger pool of officers could allow the officers to purchase meals on an individual meal basis (after payment of a small monthly dues amount). Such arrangements were called "Open Messes".

The mess now is called a dining facility or DFAC. The Officers' Club ("O Club") is an outgrowth comparable to the Officers' Open Mess, but also providing areas to allow officers to entertain guests. A similar version for enlisted personnel is the "E Club". Mess also describes the formal affair of having a "dining in", held for military members and closed to the public, or a "dining out", a social event for military personnel and their families.

For much of the 20th century the Army's mess food selection was spartan, but after the end of the draft they changed to a food court model with more variety including fast food, while also making fast food franchises available on bases. In 2011, the Army rolled out a program known as "Soldier Athlete" which promotes healthier foods including low-fat milk, whole grains, and veggie wraps.

=== U.S. Navy ===
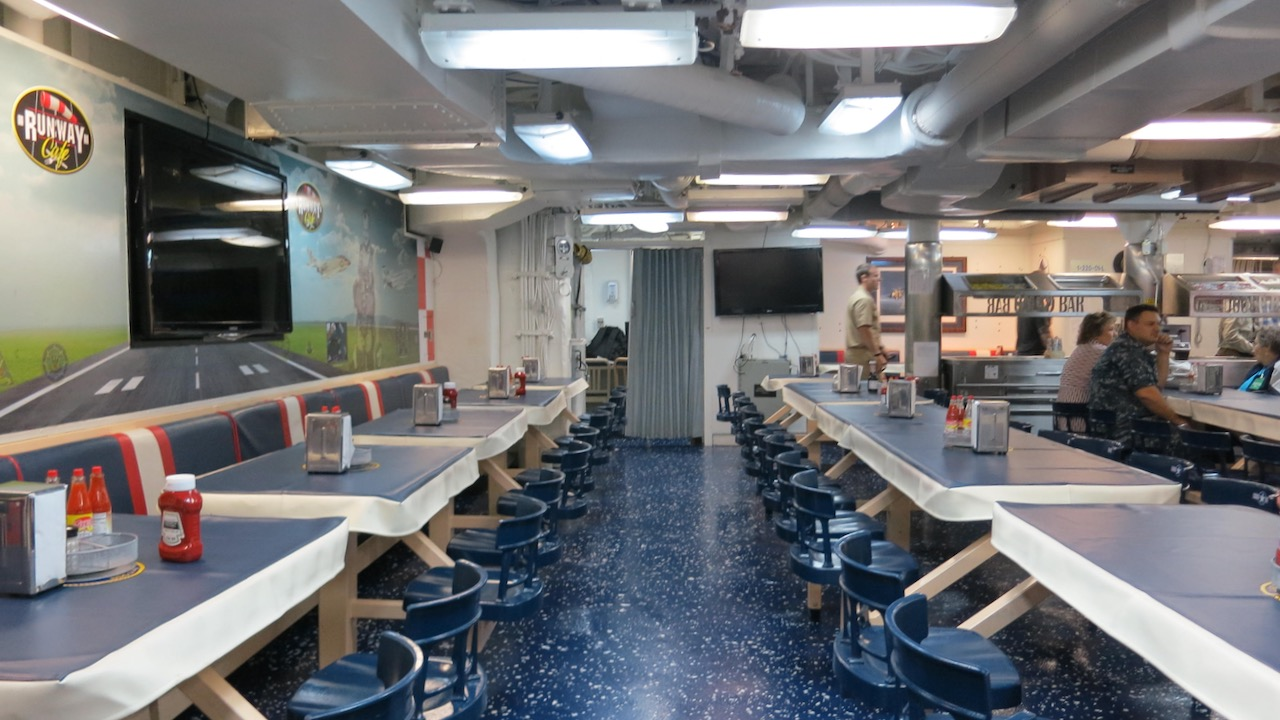
Example of a mess aboard a U.S. Navy Arleigh Burke-class destroyer

At most United States Navy shore installations, galleys (previously called Enlisted Dining Facilities in the 1970s and early 1980s) provide messing for sailors (and, if assigned, enlisted marines) ashore and as an option for sailors (and, if assigned, enlisted marines) aboard ships while in port at those installations. Commissioned officers may use these facilities as well.

In addition to galleys ashore, various social clubs with dining facilities may also exist. These are enlisted clubs for sailors in the grade of Petty Officer First Class (E-6) and below; chief petty officer clubs for CPOs (E-7), senior chief petty officers (E-8) and MCPOs (E-9); and officers' clubs for commissioned officers, although many have been closed, merged into combination enlisted/CPO clubs, or converted into "all hands" enlisted and officer facilities. Such changes began to be imposed following the congressionally-mandated end of Department of Defense budgetary subsidies for all such clubs in the 1990s and the subsequent need for these clubs to be financially self-sufficient. Further impacting the club system ashore for the Navy is the fact that most naval units deploy for extended periods (e.g., six to ten months) on a regular basis with, especially for shipboard personnel, requiring for senior enlisted personnel and commissioned officers to maintain concurrent membership in a ship's CPO Mess or officers' wardroom, respectively.

At sea aboard naval vessels, messing is still separate, with E-6 and below utilizing the ship's mess decks, E-7 through E-9 utilizing the ship's CPO mess, and commissioned officers being part of the wardroom. Certain large vessels (e.g., aircraft carriers, amphibious assault ships) may also include a first class mess for E-6, typically a separate dining area adjacent to the mess decks. This is considered a chance for future CPOs to learn how to be a part of a mess before they enter the CPO mess, often called by the sobriquet of "goat locker." Enlisted personnel normally receive all meals at what appears to be no cost, but in fact subsidize their meals through forfeiture of their Basic Allowance for Subsistence (BAS), also called "commuted rations," although chief petty officers may also have a mess "buy in" or monthly mess bill equivalent to the BAS. For those ships with embarked Marine Corps personnel, staff noncommissioned officers in the grades of E-7, E-8 and E-9 will also be part of the CPO Mess. Commissioned officers retain their BAS, a flat-rate allowance much smaller than the graduated by rank amount paid out to enlisted personnel; however, they must pay for all of their meals while afloat out of pocket. This usually entails a mess "buy in" as a member of the officers' mess and will typically have either a monthly mess bill or will purchase meals via some sort of debit card.

=== U.S. Air Force ===
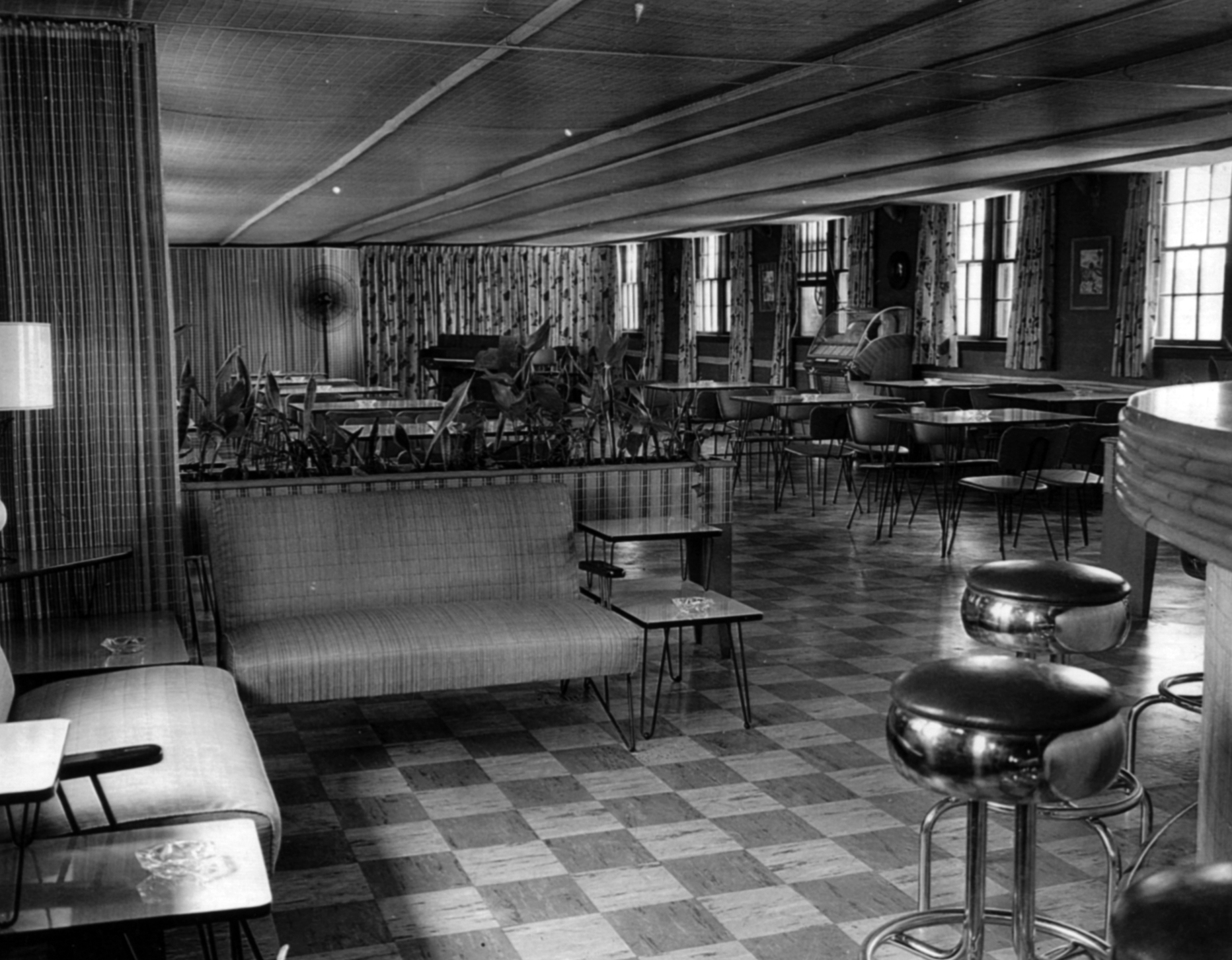
Fort Bragg NCO Club in 1954

Social clubs on United States Air Force installations were at one time called Open Messes, even though most were known in vernacular as Officers Clubs or NCO clubs. Those for officers were able to utilize their initials as colorful acronyms, among the more well-known of which in the 1960s and 1970s were Zaragosa and Zweibrücken (ZOOM), Danang (DOOM), Ramstein (ROOM), and Korat Air Bases or Kirtland Air Force Base (KABOOM), Randolph AFB (Auger Inn) and Nellis AFB (Robin's Nest), with the nicknames usually ascribed to those facilities' casual bars versus the entire club.

At one time, each squadron had its club, and some flying squadrons continue to maintain a bar in the squadron facilities for officer and enlisted aircrew to this day, but most disappeared after World War II and the various Airmen's Clubs, Senior NCO Clubs and Officers' Clubs became facilities of a base rather than a unit. Most are now officially referred to as officer or enlisted clubs; the term "mess" or "officers' open mess" having largely disappeared from the Air Force lexicon. Though a few bases (usually major training bases) have separate Airmen's Clubs for junior enlisted and NCO Clubs for noncommissioned officers, this is no longer normally the case. Physically separate Officers' Clubs still exist at some installations; however, smaller Air Force installations may have one consolidated club with separate lounges. Membership is voluntary, though highly encouraged for senior NCOs and officers. Most NCO and Officers Clubs contain a sit-down restaurant in addition to social lounges, meeting/dining rooms, and bars.

Mess halls in the USAF, where unmarried junior enlisted residing in the dormitories are expected to eat, are officially referred to as "dining facilities," but are colloquially called "chow halls," although dining facility workers traditionally take offense at the term.

=== U.S. Marine Corps ===
In the United States Marine Corps, enlisted dining facilities ashore are commonly referred to as 'galleys' or 'chow halls.' When embarked aboard naval vessels, enlisted Marines and NCOs in the rank of staff sergeant (E-6) and below use the same mess decks as sailors in the grade of petty officer first class (E-6) and below, while staff NCOs in the rank of gunnery sergeant (E-7) and above take meals in the chief petty officers (CPO) mess. Separate enlisted, NCO and officers clubs continue to exist at Marine Corps shore installations, following the Navy model of enlisted, CPO and officers clubs.

Marine Clubs have also been in decline. According to an article by USA Today:

"Alcohol deglamorization in the late '80s started the decline," says Carol Garland, head of the Marine Corps' Food and Hospitality, Personal and Family Readiness Division. "(Congressionally) appropriated funds to support the operation of clubs, including managers, were greatly reduced. Without appropriated funds, clubs had to be self-supporting businesses."

=== U.S. Coast Guard ===
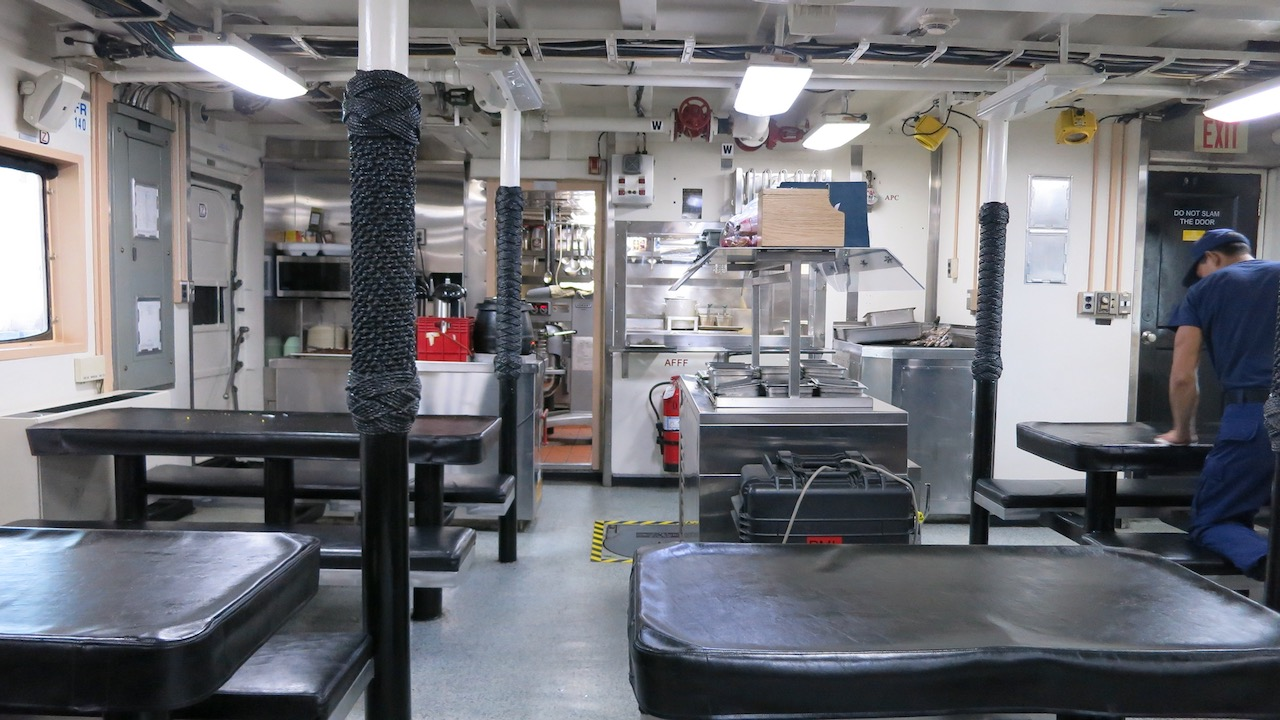
Mess aboard a USCG Reliance-class medium endurance cutter.

The United States Coast Guard follows the U.S. Navy model in terms of messing facilities afloat and ashore in terms of the demarcation of galleys for petty officer first class (E-6) and below, chief petty officer messes for chief petty officers (E-7) through master chief petty officers (E-9), and wardrooms for commissioned officers. The only exception is that, given its small size, there are very few Coast Guard clubs aboard Coast Guard shore installations and those that do exist are typically "all hands" facilities.

== See also ==
- Mess dress
- Dining in
- Wardroom
