= Queen's Regulations and Orders =

Queen's Regulations and Orders may refer to

- Queen's Regulations and Orders for the Canadian Forces
- Queen's Regulations and Orders for the British Army of the United Kingdom
