= Comparative navy enlisted ranks of Francophone countries =

Rank comparison chart of Non-commissioned officer and enlisted ranks for navies of Francophone states.

== Other ranks ==
Rank group	Senior NCOs								Junior NCOs			Enlisted
Belgian Navy
Belgian Navy	Oppermeester-chef	Oppermeester	Eerste meesterchef	Eerste meester		Meester-chef	Meester	Tweede meester	Eerste kwartiermeester-chef	Kwartiermeester-chef	Kwartiermeester	Eerste matroos	Matroos
Belgian Navy	Maître principal-chef	Maître-principal	Premier-maître chef	Premier maître		Maître-chef	Maître	Second-maître	Premier quartier-maître-chef	Quartier-maître-chef	Quartier maître	Premier matelot	Matelot
Belgian Navy	Chefhauptmeister	Hauptmeister	Erster chefmeister	Erster meister		Meister-chef	Meister	Zweiter meister	Erster oberquartiermeister	Oberquartiermeister	Quartiermeister	Erster matrose	Matrose
Benin Navy													No insignia
Benin Navy	Major	Maître principal	Premier maître			Maître		Second maître	Quartier maître de 1^{er} classe		Quartier maître 2^{ème} classe	Matelot de 1^{ère} classe	Matelot de 2^{ème} classe
Burundi	No navy
Cameroon Navy
Cameroon Navy	Maître principal		Premier maître			Maître		Second-maître	Quartier-maître de 1^{ère} classe		Quartier-maître de 2^{ème} classe	Matelot de 1^{re} classe	Matelot
Royal Canadian Navy													No insignia
Royal Canadian Navy	Chief petty officer 1st class		Chief petty officer 2nd class	Petty officer 1st class		Petty officer 2nd class			Master sailor		Sailor 1st class	Sailor 2nd class	Sailor 3rd class
Royal Canadian Navy	Premier(ère) maître de 1^{re} classe		Premier(ère) maître de 2^{e} classe	Maître de 1^{re} classe		Maître de 2^{e} classe			Matelot-chef		Matelot de 1^{re} classe	Matelot de 2^{e} classe	Matelot de 3^{e} classe
Central African Republic	No navy
Chad	No navy
Comoros	No navy
Navy of the DR Congo													No insignia
Navy of the DR Congo	Maître chef principal	Premier maître chef	Maître chef	Premier maître	Second maître	Maître		Quartier maître			Premier matelot	Second matelot	Matelot	Recrue
Congolese Navy													No insignia
Congolese Navy	Maitre-principal		Premier maitre			Maitre		Second maitre	Quartier-maitre de 1^{ère} classe		Quartier-maitre de 2^{ème} classe	Matelot de 1^{ère} classe	Matelot de 2^{ème} classe
Djiboutian Navy
Djiboutian Navy	Major	Maître-principal	Premier maître			Maître		Second maître	Quartier-maitre se 1^{ère} classe		Quartier-maitre se 2^{ème} classe	Matelot se 1^{ère} classe	Matelot de 2^{ème} classe
Navy of Equatorial Guinea
Navy of Equatorial Guinea			Brigada			Sarjento			Cabo primero		Cabo		Marinero
French Navy
French Navy	Major	Maître principal	Premier maître			Maître		Second-maître	Quartier-maître de 1^{ère} classe		Quartier-maître de 2^{ème} classe	Matelot breveté	Matelot
Gabonese Navy
Gabonese Navy	Maître-principal major	Maître-principal	Premier maître			Maître		Second maître	Quartier-maître de 1^{ère} classe		Quartier-maître de 2^{ème} classe	Matelot brevet	Matelot
Guinean Navy
Guinean Navy	Major	Maître principal	Premier maître			Maître		Second-maître	Quartier-maître de 1^{ère} classe		Quartier-maître de 2^{ème} classe	Matelot breveté	Matelot
Haitian Navy
Navy of Ivory Coast
Navy of Ivory Coast	Maitre-principal major	Maitre-principal	Premier maitre			Maitre		Second maitre	Quartier-maitre de 1^{ère} classe		Quartier-maitre de 2^{ème} classe	Matelot de 1^{ère} classe	Matelot de 2^{ème} classe
Luxembourg	No navy
Madagascar Navy													No insignia
Madagascar Navy	Maître principal	Premier maître	Maître	Second-maître de hors classe		Second-maître de 1^{ère} classe		Second-maître de 2^{ème} classe	Quartier-maître de 1^{ère} classe		Quartier-maître de 2^{ème} classe		Matelot
Monaco	No navy
Rwanda	No navy
Senegalese Navy													No insignia
Senegalese Navy	Maitre-principal		Premier maitre			Maitre		Second maitre	Quartier-maitre se 1ere classe		Quartier-maitre se 2eme classe	Matelot brevet	Matelot
Seychelles Coast Guard												No insignia
Seychelles Coast Guard	Warrant officer class 1		Warrant officer class 2	Staff sergeant		Sergeant			Corporal		Lance corporal	Private (or equivalent)
Switzerland	No navy
Togolese Navy													No insignia
Togolese Navy	Major	Maître principal	Premier-maître			Maître		Second-maître	Quartier-maitre de 1^{ère} classe		Quartier-maitre de 2^{ème} classe	Matelot de 1^{ère} classe	Matelot de 2^{ème} classe
Vanuatu Maritime Wing
Vanuatu Maritime Wing				Senior sergeant Long sajen		Sergeant; Sajen			Corporal; Kofol			Constable; Polis	Recruit; Rikrut
Rank group	Senior NCOs								Junior NCOs			Enlisted
