= Canadian Forces Drug Control Program =

Canadian government initiative

The Canadian Forces Drug Control Program is a series of regulations established in 1992 to prevent drug use among members of the Canadian Forces (CF), under the broad regulation-making auspices of section 12 of the National Defence Act (NDA). It prohibits CF members from involvement with most drugs, except alcohol and tobacco, purportedly to maintain discipline within the CF, ensure the safety, reliability or health of CF members. Chapter 20 of Queen's Regulations and Orders (QR&O 20) contains various methods for drug testing, including safety-sensitive testing, blind testing, and testing for suspicion under the article for 'testing for cause.' The regulation enforces administrative and disciplinary actions against those who violate its requirements.

== Definitions ==
QR&O 20 defines a drug as a controlled substance in the Controlled Drugs and Substances Act, or any other physiologically or psychologically impairing substance, except for alcohol, prohibited by the Chief of the Defence Staff. It defines "use" as any act of injecting, swallowing, inhaling, smoking, ingesting, or otherwise absorbing into the human body.

== Application ==
The policy (QR&O 20.02) asserts that the regulation applies to all officers and non-commissioned members. This should be read in conjunction with section 60 of the NDA which defines the limitations of the disciplinary jurisdiction of the Code of Service Discipline.

Additionally, QR&O 1.03 should be consulted which provides that "Unless the context otherwise requires, and subject to article 1.24 (Regulations and Orders – General), QR&O and all orders and instructions issued to the Canadian Forces under authority of the National Defence Act, apply to: the Regular Force, Special Force, Reserve Force when subject to the code of service discipline..." QR&O 20 states that the order applies to all officers and NCMs - based on standard statutory interpretation, the more specific statute overrides the more general one; the administrative aspects of QR&O 20 likely apply to reservists not performing military functions. It may well be true that this is also the case for disciplinary action applied to reservists not performing military duties, given the wording of QR&O 20.

== Prohibition ==
QR&O 20 prohibits the use of any drug unless it is authorized by a medical professional, is a non-prescription medication used in accordance with accompanying instructions or is required in the course of military duties. These factors are further constrained by the limitation imposed in the notes: a drug may not be used if its use is contrary to another law of Canada.

Whether these constraints imposed by QR&O 20.04 are complete and span the spectrum of drug use is difficult to discern. It is certain that the prohibition in place precludes the use of drugs whose use is not an offence under the Controlled Drugs and Substances Act (e.g. Schedule IV drugs).

== Testing schemes ==
There are a number of means of enforcing QR&O 20 through testing. The policy, however, provides for other means (e.g. education) of promoting the policy's goals. A number of these schemes, in practice, were suspended after the Privacy Commissioner of Canada released a report attacking the validity of drug testing in the Federal sector with an analysis that includes the Canadian Forces.

=== Deterrent testing ===
This testing scheme would allow Commanding Officers to order tests on a random basis. Its focus is to deter use of drugs by allowing random seizure of urine samples. The test results from these samples could be used in administrative proceedings.

=== Safety-sensitive testing ===
The stated aim of this testing is to randomly detect drug use on the part of those who are in positions that may affect safety. This type has been constitutionally tested and is sound under certain conditions.

=== Incident-related testing ===
If drug use is believed to have occurred in relation to an accident or incident and there is not sufficient time to conduct an investigation before the drug in use could be metabolised within the body such that its use could not be detected, Commanding Officers are authorized to order a test. The focus of the policy is on discerning all factors that caused an incident and promoting safety; the results from a urine test cannot be used at disciplinary proceedings.

=== Blind testing ===
May be conducted under the authority of the Chief of Defence Staff or his delegate against a unit or member. The testing is random and anonymous and is used solely to gauge drug use in the CF for improvement of policy.

=== Testing for cause ===
May be conducted by a CO so long as he or she has reasonable grounds to believe that drug use prohibited by QR&O 20 has occurred. The second mandatory component of this test requires a reasonable belief that the presence of a drug may be detected within the time the urine test is administered. It requires Commanding Officers to first give the accused an opportunity to review the reasonable grounds collected and then to provide submissions, should they choose to do so, as to the reasonableness of the grounds developed. These procedural entitlements are prescribed in order to meet the requirements of natural justice.

The results from a test under testing for cause may be used in the disciplinary or administrative context.

QR&O 20.11 para 4 provides that the summary of the reasonable grounds given to the accused is subject to filtering ordinarily required by the Privacy Act and Access to Information Act. This explicit interpretation has been overruled in at paragraphs 16 through 17. To summarize this Federal Court finding it suffices to say that because of the serious interests at stake to the accused, full unfettered access to the Military Police report was essential in order to assist him point out inconsistencies or credibility issues in his accusers. Personnel subject to either administrative (release or C&P) or disciplinary action are therefore entitled to an unedited version of any evidence used against them. Since Testing for Cause mandates that an accused be provided with a summary of the reasonable grounds, it may well be the case that they are entitled to a copy of an MP report into their alleged drug use prior to the seizure of urine.

DND and the CF have made no policy changes to reflect this new requirement; it is entirely possible that the old practice of filtering such information persists.

=== Control testing ===
Control testing is an administrative regime, used as a follow up to ensure that members who have been caught using drugs contrary to QR&O 20 abstain from doing so. It is the authority from which follow-up testing is permitted during administrative handling of drug use. Test results may be used in the administrative and disciplinary contexts.

== Consequences ==
The consequences of a positive test may include administrative or disciplinary action. Disciplinary action could consist of a charge under s. 129 of the National Defence Act for failure to observe instructions. A finding of guilty could lead to financial penalties, detention or release in a less-than-honourable fashion. Administrative action usually would consist of a 1-year period of Counselling and Probation. Release through administrative action is also possible even after a first offence. There is no limitation on the use of both administrative and disciplinary action.

== Controversy ==
=== Generalities ===
Both administrative and disciplinary action for drug use contrary to QR&O 20 are very serious. They raise a number of concerns that have either been resolved or are addressed in the following:

- Privacy Commissioner's Report on Drug Testing
- Drug Testing and Legal Implications
- Gayler v. Canada
- Canadian Human Rights Act, Canadian Human Rights Commission, Canadian Human Rights Tribunal
- Canadian Bill of Rights
- Canadian Charter of Rights and Freedoms

=== Institutional bias ===
An investigation instigated under Testing for Cause will most often be conducted by Military Police (MP); it is common practice that the order requiring this investigation is given by the same CO responsible for the ultimate determination as to the reasonableness of the grounds for ordering testing for cause. QR&O 20.11 is ambiguous as to whether or not the "investigating CO" may also conduct the determination for testing for cause. This is a highly troubling ambiguity; where the facts indicate the "investigating CO" was also involved at the testing-for-cause stage, an apprehension of bias or explicit bias may exist. Natural justice in an administrative matter involving an adversarial process and serious outcomes for the accused require a high standard of natural justice; an accused under QR&O 20.11 faces serious (potentially terminal) administrative career consequences, disciplinary proceedings (where his/her liberty may be at stake), and more importantly, the threat of disciplinary action for failing to submit to a test. This threat may engage the security of the person under either the Charter or Bills of Rights.

Some of these issues were analyzed in the Federal Court of Canada which were later brought to appeal in the Federal Court of Appeal. The first-instance decision was rejected, in part, by the Appeals Court on the issues relating to waiver (as unrepresented laymen cannot waive their rights; nor can waiver exist without the breach's grounds at the disposal of the affected party) however, the appellant was ultimately unsuccessful due to a factual prerequisite issue. The Appeals Court consequently chose not to address the validity of the issue of an apprehension of bias. The first-instance decision is not binding on subsequent applicant's seeking review in the Federal Court and the matter remains open for exploration at this level.

==== Apprehension of bias ====
The foremost concern in QR&O 20.11 stems from the lack of transparency in the process at the testing stage. The policy suggests that it is the CO who orders an investigation and that it is the CO who determines whether reasonable grounds exist to make an order for testing. It is also the CO who is to receive any submissions from the implicated individual, and it is the CO who will then decide whether to order the actual test. It is a cornerstone of our system of justice that matters be decided by an impartial and independent decision maker. The process of only involving the CO appears to be a clear instance of institutional bias, which operates when the same person who is responsible for the investigation of a matter also decides whether there is enough merit to proceed with a complaint and then adjudicates the complaint.

==== The test ====
The test for apprehension of bias is established in:

"A reasonable apprehension of bias may be raised where an informed person, viewing the matter realistically and practically and having thought the matter through, would think it more likely than not that the decision maker would unconsciously or consciously decide the issue unfairly [emphasis added]."

Further:

"16. .... But there is one phrase in one sentence in the test that I think is wrong. I will underline the words I think are wrong in the sentence that contains them:

'... Would he think that it is more likely than not that [the decision-maker], whether consciously or unconsciously, would not decide fairly.'

In my opinion the simple question which requires an answer in each case is this: Is there a real possibility that a reasonable person, properly informed and viewing the circumstances realistically and practically, could conclude that the decision-maker might well be prone to bias?

I would not like to think that it would be in accordance with natural justice for a decision-maker to be equally likely to be biased as not to be biased. But that is what the test suggests in the words "more likely than not". The statement of the test as more likely to be biased than not simply cannot be right. And, as far as I can tell, it has never been endorsed by the Supreme Court of Canada or by this Court as the correct weighing to give to the respective degrees of likelihood in a reasonable apprehension of bias case."

The CO may have acted without vexatious or malicious intent. He may have had entirely honourable principles in mind with a complete intent to observe the law. He may also have held the accused in the highest regard and, yet, his involvement at multiple stages of the investigation will still bring rise to an apprehension of bas. His original decision-making process predisposes him to a certain frame of mind. He would therefore be inclined to decide the matter unconsciously in favour of ordering the urine test. This is the rational surrounding the doctrine of apprehension of bias as opposed to bias itself. Behaviour that would tend to contraindicate bias is not a basis to reject a bias argument:

"Further it has been established that, in dealing with an allegation of apprehension of bias, evidence which would have the effect of negating bias is irrelevant and is not to be considered. In Jones and de Villars, Principles of Administrative Law, 2d. ed., (Carswell, Toronto: 1994), the authors state at p. 365:

…common sense says that the delegate (or another party) can lead evidence to contradict that introduced by the applicant for the judicial review. The purpose of such evidence is to show that there is no reasonable apprehension of bias disclosed by the facts. On the other hand, it would appear to be wrong in principle to permit the delegate (or another party) to lead evidence to show that there was no actual bias, or no actual participation by a disqualified person in the decision. Such evidence is irrelevant to determining whether there is an apprehension of bias, and therefore is inadmissible.

[14] Similarly, in Dussault and Bourgeat, Administrative Law: A Treatise (Vol. 4), 2d. ed., (Carswell, Toronto: 1990), it is stated, at pp. 299-300: To have a decision by a public officer or agency set aside for bias, it is thus not necessary to prove without a doubt that prejudice or interest was present; only the existence of circumstances likely to give rise to an apprehension of bias need exist. As explained by Dickson J. of the Supreme Court in Kane v. Board of Governors of the University of British Columbia in discussing the sixth proposition upon which the appeal was based: The court will not inquire whether the evidence did work to the prejudice of one of the parties; it is sufficient if it might have done so."

...[17] In his reasons quoted above, the motions court judge refers to actual bias as opposed to dealing with the concept of reasonable apprehension of bias. The concepts are quite different and cannot be used interchangeably. It is an error in law to deal with the concept of actual as opposed to apprehended bias just as it is an error to place any weight or consideration on the fact that the adjudicating body might have reached a decision that appears to be eminently reasonable."

It is a difficult matter to establish case law to support such a proposition. Nevertheless, consider:

"[14] In R. v. Gushman, [1994] O.J. No. 813 (QL) (Ont. Ct. J. (Gen Div.)), Watt J. was dealing with the apprehension of bias in order to succeed in a complaint of jurisdictional error. Nevertheless, I find some of his statements to be apposite. At para. 32 he wrote:

It is trite that every allegation that judicial conduct gives rise to a reasonable apprehension of bias falls to be decided upon its own facts. It follows that a parade of authorities, parsing precedent in vain search of factual equivalents or reasonable facsimiles, is not to the purpose."

==== Institutional bias as a matter of policy ====
As a matter of practice and policy the CO will almost always conduct both roles. The obsolesced order in CFAO 19-21 has been replaced with equivalent provisions in stating:

"A commanding officer (CO) shall ensure that any suspected prohibited drug use or other involvement with drugs is investigated as soon as practicable.

The CO may contact the Military Police or the Canadian Forces National Investigation Service for assistance and guidance in determining the most appropriate form of investigation.

Upon initiation of an investigation of suspected prohibited drug use or other involvement with drugs, the CO shall consult with DMCA in regard to both testing and administrative recourse.

Clearly, directives within the CF make the CO the predominant agent responsible for the instigation of investigations into drug infractions. The standard of decision making to which the CO is held is a low one as he operates in a low-level capacity similar to that of the Courts; on the other hand, the Chief of Defence Staff (CDS), potentially reviewing these matters during the grievance process, is to be accorded the standard of the closed mind.

In, the following was said about a plurality of roles as it relates to impartiality:

146 According to consistent rulings by the Supreme Court, a plurality of functions in a single institution does not really present a problem provided that at various stages of the process those functions are not all performed by the same .... It is rather a plurality of functions in a single person which creates a problem. Briefly, the fact that the actual wording of the Act does not guarantee the administrative tribunal's impartiality and independence is not fatal to its constitutionality. It will suffice if the wording is [page617] neutral and does not prevent the institution from organizing itself so that a fully informed person having thought the matter through in a realistic and practical way would not have a reasonable apprehension of bias or of the existence of a lack of independence in practice (2747-3174 Québec Inc., at paragraphs 47-48).

147 However, as Gonthier J. noted in 2747-3174 Québec Inc., at paragraph 48, "although an overlapping of functions is not always a ground for concern, it must nevertheless not result in excessively close relations among employees involved in different stages of the process" (emphasis added). Thus, he noted at paragraph 45 that "this necessary flexibility, and the difficulty involved in isolating the essential elements of institutional impartiality, must not be used to justify ignoring serious deficiencies in a quasi-judicial process. The perception of impartiality remains essential to maintaining public confidence in the justice system" (emphasis added).

==== Applicability at the investigative stage ====
Natural justice applies at investigative stages:

"[30] Furthermore, it has been determined that procedural fairness applies to investigative and consultative functions:. The duty to act fairly exists whenever an administrative decision may affect the rights, interests, property or liberties of any person who is the subject of an investigation that might result in that person's being penalized or adversely affected as a result of the investigation or report."

==== Teleological constraint from parent act ====
In furtherance of this notion, consider overriding constraint present in sections 273.3 and 273.4 of the National Defence Act in the authorization of search warrants – providing that a CO lacking prior involvement in an investigation should be consulted to authorize a warrant. A literal interpretation of section 273.3 indicates section 273.4 applies only to areas controlled by DND, work lockers, and the personal or movable property of individuals located on in or about any defence property. Furthermore, the order for urine testing is not a warrant in the normal and literal sense.

A literal interpretation of section 273.4 is neither required nor determinative. If urine is not included in the class of things which constitute personal property, a teleological analysis of the interaction of section 273.4 and QR&O 20.11 is necessary. Consider the analysis in, where Mr. Justice Hensen provided the following:

In at paras 28, 29 and 30, Justice Lysyk made a number of observations that are helpful in this analysis. He stated:

"28. In determining the scope of a power or discretion delegated by Parliament it may be necessary to look beyond the literal terms of the particular delegating provision of the enactment to ascertain limitations on that power or discretion which must have been intended by Parliament. …

29. Rephrased in terms less charged than evasion of an Act of Parliament, the underlying principle is familiar enough. In determining whether impugned subordinate legislation has been enacted in conformity with the terms of the parent statutory provision, it is essential to ascertain the scope of the mandate conferred by Parliament, having regard to the purpose(s) or objects(s) of the enactment as a whole. The test of conformity with the Act is not satisfied merely by showing that the delegate stayed within the literal (and often broad) terminology of the enabling provision when making subordinate legislation. (emphasis added) The power-conferring language must be taken to be qualified by the overriding requirement that the subordinate legislation accord with the purposes and objects of the parent enactment read as a whole.

32. … the delegate may not frustrate or evade the Act of Parliament or exercise his discretionary powers arbitrarily or otherwise than in accordance with the purposes or objects of the enactment. The delegate must not only stay within the literal terms of the delegating provision but must respect, as well, restrictions upon his mandate that are implicit in the legislative scheme considered in its entirety. "

It seems a perversity that Parliament would have intended a lower standard in the seizure of bodily fluids than it would have in the search of a locker.

It might be argued that sections s. 273.2-273.5 of the NDA do not apply to a CO when analyzing the standard for a urine seizure as he/she may not be investigating an offence or adjudicating a complaint but rather considering an administrative measure. In reality the adversarial process arising when a CO considers the seizure of urine under QR&O 20, is a judicial or quasi-judicial one and the manner of compelling a urine sample (the written order) is a warrant of sorts – at the very least, within the teleological constraints of s. 273.4.

There is no clear direction in QR&O 20.11 as to whether or not the investigating CO is authorized to order a urine seizure; in this sense QR&O 20.11 is ambiguous and "where the legislation is silent or ambiguous, courts generally infer that the legislators intended the tribunal's process to comport with principles of natural justice." Such a reconsideration suggests the validity of the teleological interaction of QR&O 20.11 and s. 273.4 of the NDA.

In the event that it is found that there does exist a contradiction between s. 273 of the NDA and QR&O 20.11, it is submitted that provides grounds for the regulation to be struck. In his book on Administrative Law (Chapter 8 section D), Professor Mullan cites to assert that "the courts sometimes adopt the posture that Parliament or the legislature did not intend the subordinate to devise rules contrary to normal or common law procedural standards." In Joplin, a regulation precluding an accused's use of solicitor to represent him at a police hearing was struck down merely on such a presumption by the judge.

==== The effect ====
The CO's involvement at multiple stages of the process gives rise to an apprehension of bias contrary to section 2(e) of the Bill; these procedures appear to abrogate section 2(e) of the Bill as best described in:

"[25] The applicable standard in determining the result of a breach of the rules of procedural fairness and natural justice is clear: the decision made by the administrative authorities is invalid, as Mr. Justice Le Dain held in: . . . I find it necessary to affirm that the denial of a right to a fair hearing must always render a decision invalid, whether or not it may appear to a reviewing court that the hearing would likely have resulted in a different decision. The right to a fair hearing must be regarded as an independent, unqualified right which finds its essential justification in the sense of procedural justice which any person affected by an administrative decision is entitled to have. It is not for a court to deny that right and sense of justice on the basis of speculation as to what the result might have been had there been a hearing. [para. 23]

Since the urine order occurred at such an early stage (at the investigative stage), rendering "any order" null and void will nullify the urine order. Such a failing could potentially spell doom for any administrative action taken against an accused as the process might be tainted beyond hope of recovery and a subsequent urine order would be of no benefit given the half life of metabolites in the body. In disciplinary proceedings, the test might be excluded but other evidence gathered during the investigation might be sufficient to justify action against the accused. The effect of the taint is questionable as the test is ordered under the low standard of reasonableness as compared to higher standards such as a balance of probability or reasonable and probable grounds.

=== Security of the person ===
Section 2(e) of the Bill guarantees the right to procedural fairness in the determination of rights and obligations. This section of the Bill applies to administrative tribunals as per:

"54. I agree with Professor Hogg that, in view of the limited application of paragraph 11(d) of the Canadian Charter of Rights and Freedoms [being Part I of the Constitution Act, 1982, Schedule B, Canada Act 1982, 1982, c. 11 (U.K.) (R.S.C., 1985, Appendice II, No. 44)], the Canadian Bill of Rights can play an important supplementive role with respect to the determination of rights and obligations by a civil or an administrative tribunal: see P. Hogg, "A Comparison of the Canadian Charter of Rights and Freedoms with the Canadian Bill of Rights", in Beaudoin, G. A. and Ratushny E., The Canadian Charter of Rights and Freedoms, 2nd ed., Toronto: Carswell, 1989, page 1. At page 14, he writes:

A civil proceeding before a court or administrative tribunal is not subject to the requirement of a "fair hearing" or of the application of "fundamental justice". This is a gap in the Charter, and is therefore an area where the continued existence of the Bill is important: an adjudication authorized by federal law of a person's rights and obligations will continue to be subject to the requirement of "a fair hearing in accordance with the principles of fundamental justice".

As counselling and probation is defined as "the last attempt at salvaging a member's career," it is viewed as a very serious obligation as it results in the member's career being placed in limbo during its one-year period (i.e. precluding eligibility for training selection and promotion, incentive and pay increases). In asserted that natural justice was applicable in career settings where there were serious career considerations at stake. This is evidenced in the military career setting in, where C&P was quashed due to an irreparable failing of the audi alteram partem principle.

The threat of disciplinary action for failing to submit to a test or for testing positive for a banned substance is sufficient to invoke the security of the person. In citing, Coultas J. stated the following:

"McKay J. held that s. 7 of the Charter was also applicable due to the "direct link between disciplinary proceedings for failure to obey an order to provide a specimen". Disciplinary proceedings could result in the liberty interest of an inmate being affected contrary to s.7. He held that s. 41.1 contravened s. 7 of the Charter as it was an interference with bodily integrity, and thus an interference with the inmate's security. He said, at p. 88:

While there is but a limited privacy and protection of bodily integrity and expectation of those in the prison setting, what remains, including freedom from state examination of bodily wastes without consent, ought not to be taken away except in accord with principles of fundamental justice. Here the absence of criteria for requiring a specimen, while that may not lead to abuse by reasonable staff members, provides no standards for determining when abuse arises, it is not tied to reasonable and probable cause even where that is the basis on which the requirement is ordered, or to any other standard or circumstance that would reasonably support the requirement in light of its explained purposes. No provision is made for advising the inmate why the specimen is required, or for the inmate, in circumstances such as those relied upon here where a staff member believes or suspects the inmate has consumed an intoxicant, to explain his conduct or action before a decision is finally made to require the specimen."

The prison setting can clearly be distinguished from that of the Canadian Forces. In the prison setting, there is little to no expectation of privacy and there are few procedural entitlements. Members of the Canadian Forces should be entitled to a greater procedural entitlement than convicts in a prison:

"When society employs young men and women to maintain law and order in a sometimes unreasonable and irreverent society, it impliedly promises them justice and nothing else will suffice."
