= Comparative army enlisted ranks of Francophone countries =

Rank comparison chart of Non-commissioned officer and enlisted ranks for armies/land forces of Francophone states.

== Other ranks ==
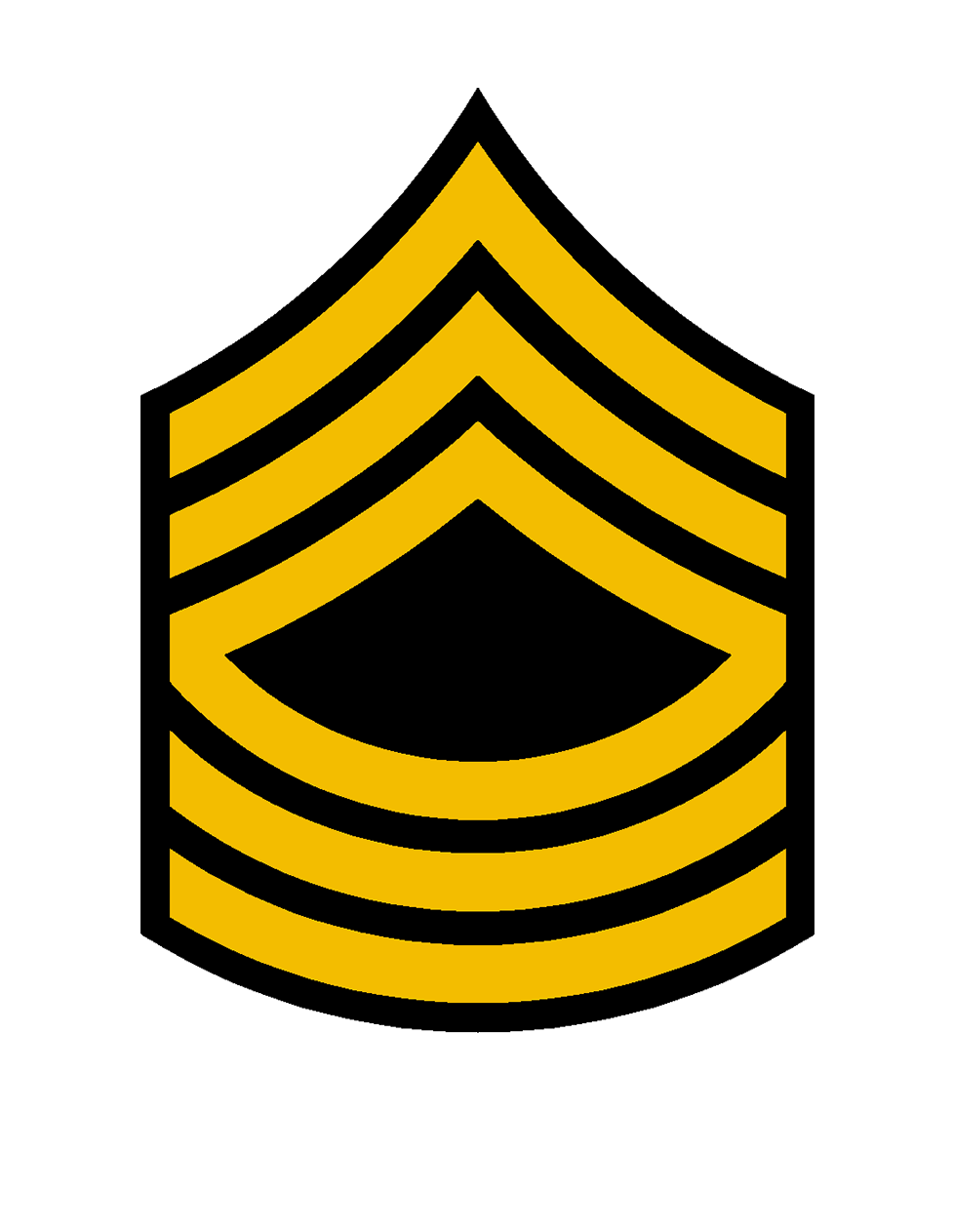
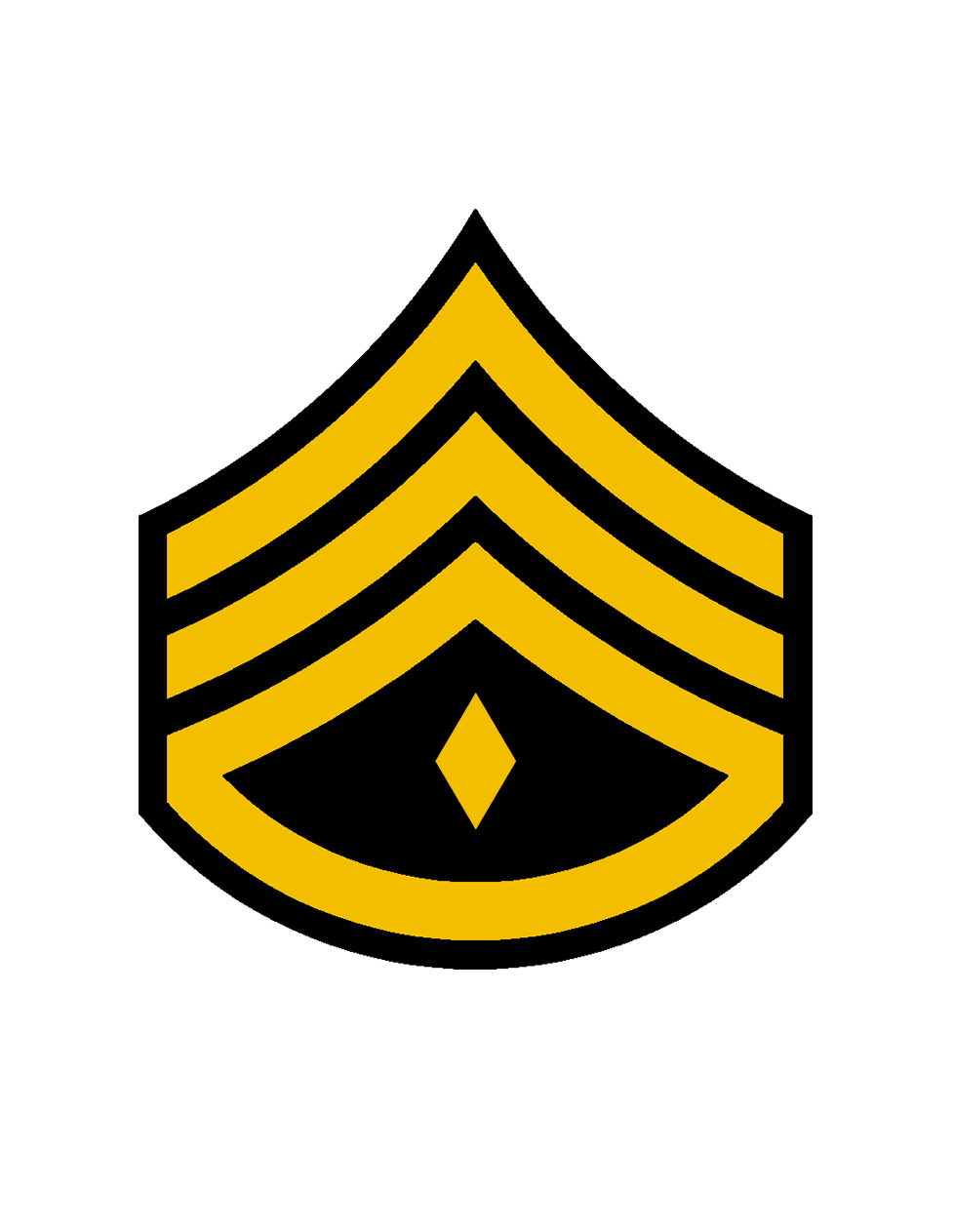
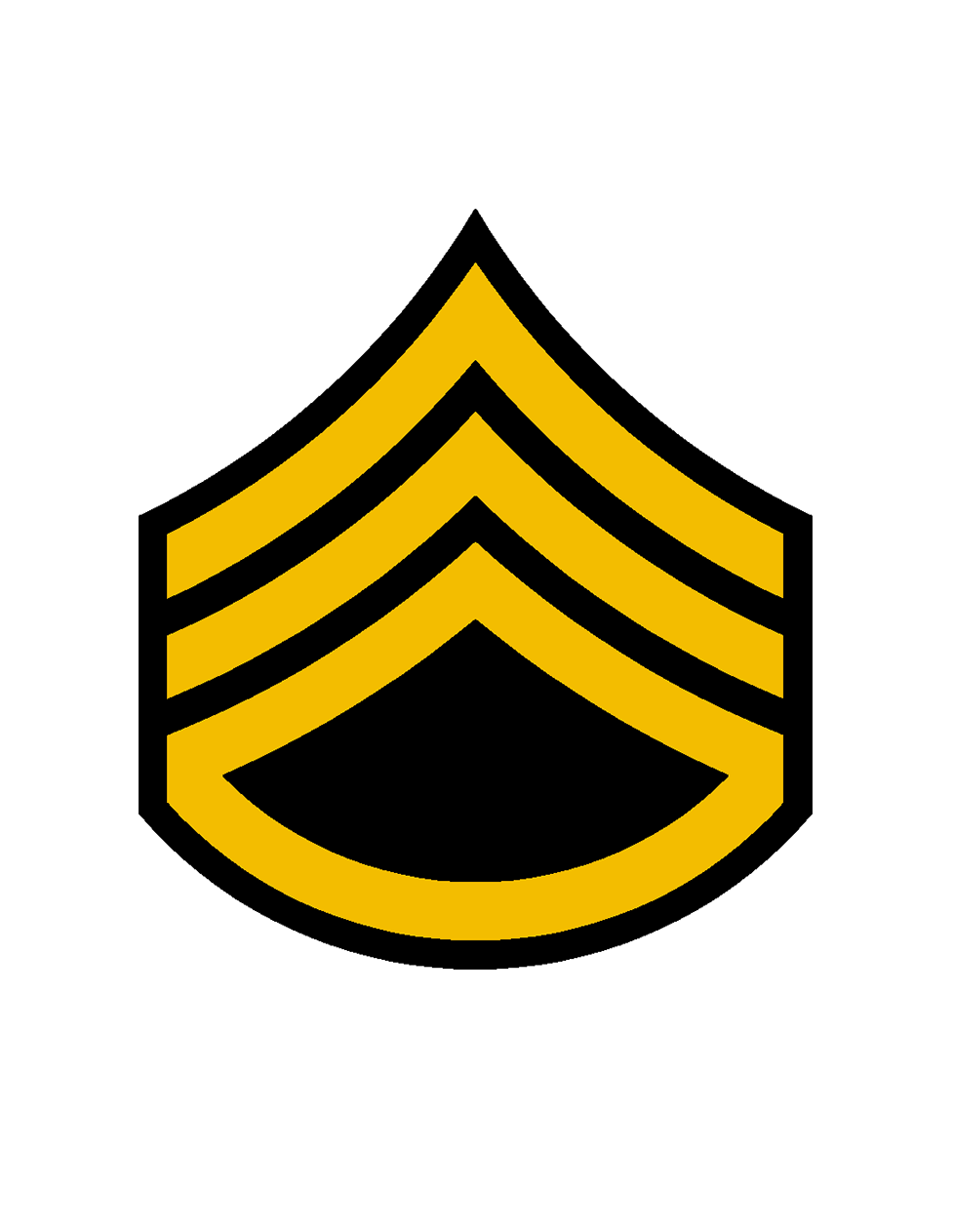
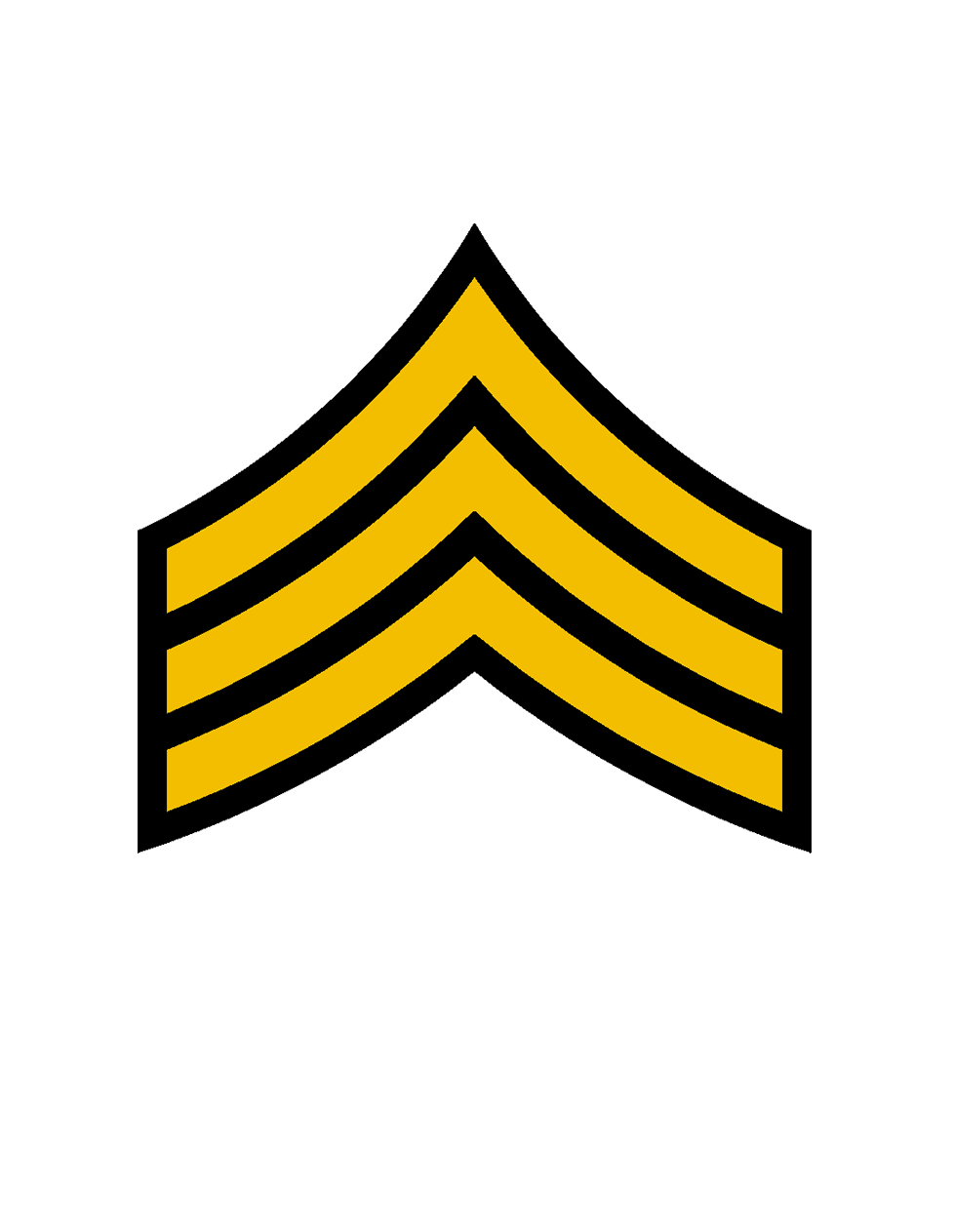
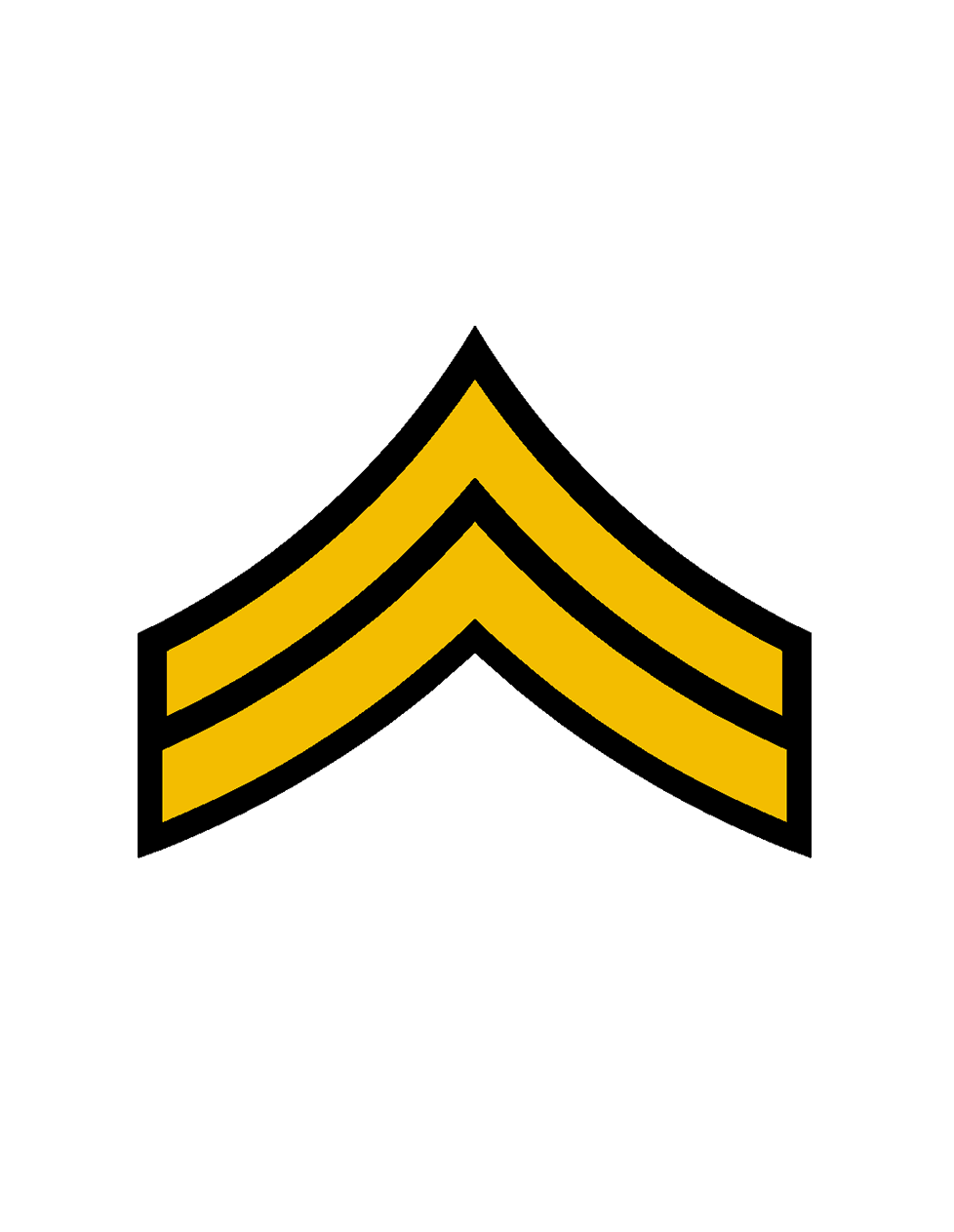
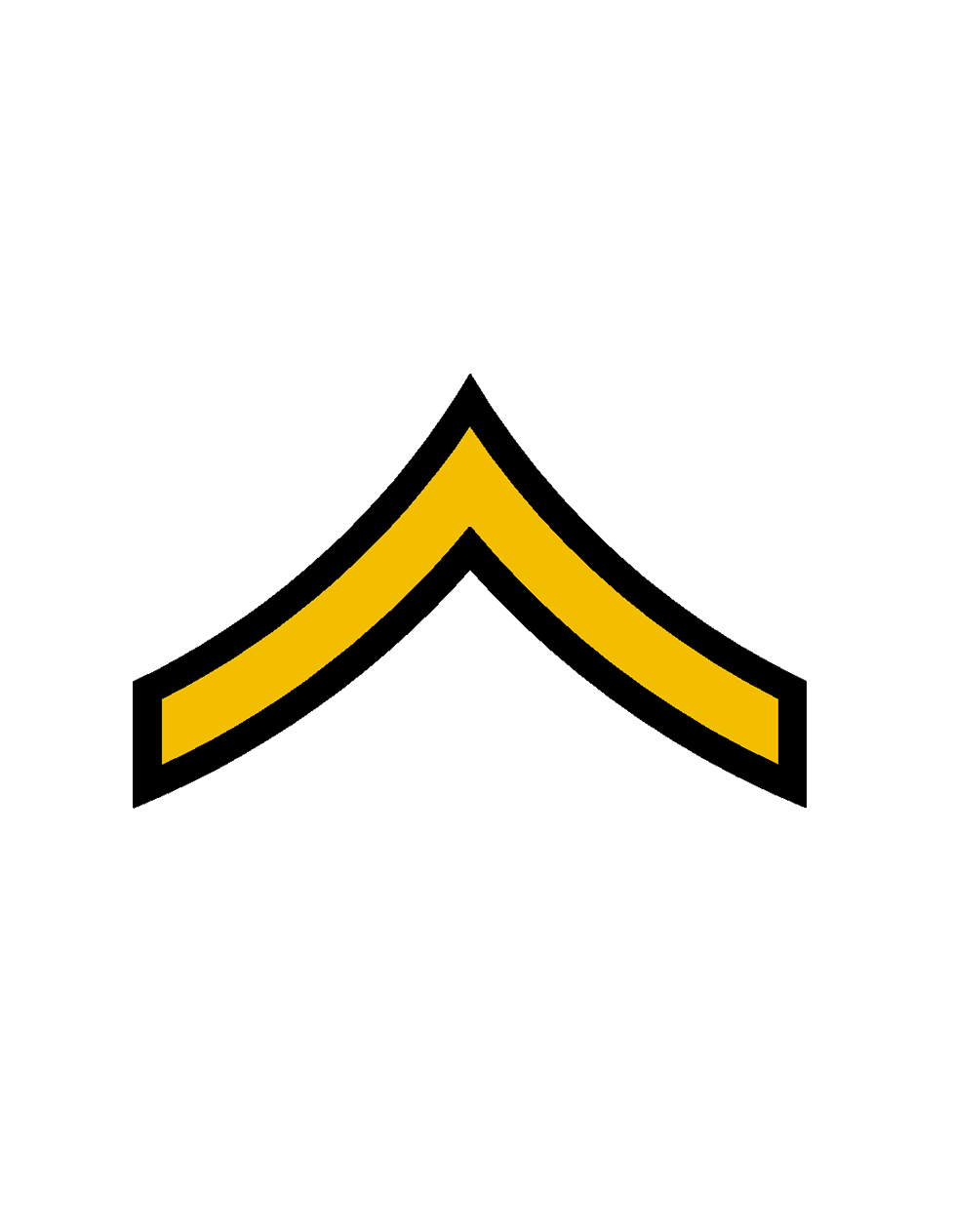
Rank group	Senior NCOs										Junior NCOs				Enlisted
Belgian Land Component
Belgian Land Component	Adjudant-majoor	Adjudant-chef	Adjudant		1ste sergeant-majoor		1ste sergeant-chef	1ste sergeant	Sergeant		1ste korporaal-chef	Korporaal-chef	Korporaal		1ste soldaat		Soldaat
Belgian Land Component	Adjudant-major	Adjudant-chef	Adjudant		1e sergent-major		1e sergent-chef	1e sergent	Sergent		1e caporal-chef	Caporal-chef	Caporal		1 soldat		Soldat
Belgian Land Component	Majoradjutant	Chefadjudant	Adjudant		1er Sergeant major		1er Sergeant chef	1er Sergeant	Sergeant		1er Korporal chef	Korporal chef	Korporal		1er soldat		Soldat
Benin Army
Benin Army	Major	Adjudant-chef	Adjudant				Sergent-chef		Sergent		Caporal-chef		Caporal		Soldat de 1^{ère} classe		Soldat de 2^{ème} classe
Burundi Army																	No insignia
Burundi Army	Adjudant-major	Adjudant-chef	Adjudant		Première sergent major		Première sergent		Sergent		Caporal-chef		Caporal		Soldat de 1^{ère} classe		Soldat de 2^{ème} classe
Burundi Army	Ajida shefu	Ajida majoro	Ajida		Sereja majoro mu murwi wa mbere		Sereja mu murwi wa mbere		Sereja		Kaporari shefu		Kaporari		Umusoda wo mu murwi wa mbere		Umusoda wo mu murwi wa kabiri
Cameroon Ground Forces
Cameroon Ground Forces	Adjudant-chef		Adjudant				Sergent-chef		Sergent		Caporal-chef		Caporal		Soldat première		Soldat
Canadian Army																	No insignia
Canadian Army	Chief warrant officer		Master warrant officer		Warrant officer		Sergeant				Master corporal		Corporal		Private (trained)		Private (basic)
Canadian Army	Adjudant(e)-chef		Adjudant(e)-maître		Adjudant(e)		Sergent(e)				Caporal(e)-chef		Caporal(e)		Soldat(e) (formé(e))		Soldat(e) (confirmé(e))
(Central African Republic) Central African Ground Forces																	No insignia
(Central African Republic) Central African Ground Forces	Adjudant-chef		Adjudant		Sergent-major		Sergent-chef		Sergent		Caporal-chef		Caporal		Soldat première		Soldat
Chadian Ground Forces																	No insignia
Chadian Ground Forces					Sergent major		Sergent-chef		Sergent				Caporal		Soldat première		Soldat
Comorian Army
Comorian Army	Adjudant-chef		Adjudant				Sergent-chef		Sergent		Caporal-chef		Caporal		Soldat de 1^{ère} classe		Soldat
Land Forces of the DR Congo																	No insignia
Land Forces of the DR Congo	Adjudant-chef	Adjudant de première classe	Adjudant		Premier sergent major	Sergent major	Premier sergent		Sergent				Caporal		Soldat de première classe		Soldat de seconde classe	Recrue
Congolese Ground Forces																	No insignia
Congolese Ground Forces	Adjudant-chef		Adjudant				Sergent-chef		Sergent		Caporal-chef		Caporal		Soldat 1^{ère} classe		Soldat 2^{e} classe
Djiboutian Army
Djiboutian Army	Major	Adjudant-chef	Adjudant				Sergent-chef		Sergent		Caporal-chef		Caporal		Soldat de 1^{ère} classe		Soldat de 2^{ème} classe
Army of Equatorial Guinea
Army of Equatorial Guinea			Brigada		Sargento primero		Sarjento				Cabo primero		Cabo				Soldado
French Army
French Army	Major	Adjudant-chef	Adjudant		Sergent-chef BM2/ Maréchal-des-logis-chef BM2		Sergent-chef/ Maréchal-des-logis-chef		Sergent/ Maréchal-des-logis		Caporal-chef de 1^{re} classe	Caporal-chef/ Brigadier-chef	Caporal/ Brigadier		Soldat de 1^{re} classe		Soldat
Gabonese Army
Gabonese Army	Adjudant-chef major	Adjudant-chef	Adjudant				Sergent-chef		Sergent		Caporal-chef		Caporal		Soldat première		Soldat
Guinea Ground Forces
Guinea Ground Forces	Major	Adjudant-chef	Adjudant				Sergent-chef		Sergent		Caporal-chef		Caporal		Soldat de 1^{ère} classe		Soldat de 2^{ème} classe
Haitian Army																	No Insigna
Haitian Army			Sergent major		Premier sergent		Sergent-fourrier		Sergent				Caporal		Soldat de première classe		Soldat
Haitian Army			Sèjan majò		Premye sèjan		Sèjan-fourye		Sèjan				Kaporal		Sòlda premye klas		Sòlda
Ivory Coast Ground Forces
Ivory Coast Ground Forces	Adjudant-chef major	Adjudant-chef	Adjudant				Sergent-chef		Sergent		Caporal-chef		Caporal		Soldat de première classe		Soldat de seconde classe
Luxembourg Army
Luxembourg Army	Adjudant-major	Adjudant-chef	Adjudant		Sergent-chef		Premier sergent		Sergent		Premier caporal-chef	Caporal-chef	Caporal de première classe	Caporal	Premier soldat-chef	Soldat-chef	Soldat de première classe	Soldat
Madagascar Ground Forces																	No insignia
Madagascar Ground Forces	Adjudant-major	Adjudant-chef	Adjudant		Sergent-major		Sergent-chef		Sergent		Caporal-chef		Caporal				Soldat
Army of Monaco
Army of Monaco	Adjudant-chef		Adjudant		Maréchal-des-logis-major		Maréchal-des-logis-chef		Maréchal-des-logis				Brigadier		Carabinier de première classe		Carabinier de deuxième classe
Rwandan Land Forces																	No insignia
Rwandan Land Forces	Warrant officer I		Warrant officer II		Sergeant major		Staff sergeant		Sergeant				Corporal				Private
Senegalese Army																	No insignia
Senegalese Army	Adjudant-chef		Adjudant				Sergent-chef		Sergent		Caporal-chef		Caporal		Soldat de première classe		Soldat
Seychelles Army															No insignia
Seychelles Army	Warrant officer class 1		Warrant officer class 2		Staff sergeant		Sergeant				Corporal		Lance corporal		Private (or equivalent)
Swiss Army
Swiss Army	Chefadjutant	Hauptadjutant	Stabsadjutant	Adjutant unteroffizier	Hauptfeldweibel	Fourier	Feldweibel		Oberwachtmeister	Wachtmeister	Korporal		Obergefreiter		Gefreiter		Soldat
Swiss Army	Adjudant-chef	Adjudant-major	Adjudant d'état-major	Adjudant sous-officier	Sergent-major chef	Fourrier	Sergent-major		Sergent chef	Sergent	Caporal		Appointé-chef		Appointé		Soldat
Togolese Army																	No insignia
Togolese Army	Major	Adjudant-chef	Adjudant				Sergent-chef		Sergent		Caporal-chef		Caporal		Soldat de 1^{ère} classe		Soldat de 2^{ème} classe
Vanuatu Mobile Forces
Vanuatu Mobile Forces	Warrant officer class 1		Warrant officer class 2		Staff sergeant		Sergeant				Corporal		Lance corporal		Constable		Recruit
Vanuatu Mobile Forces					Staf Sajen		Sajen				Kofol				Polis		Rikrut
Rank group	Senior NCOs										Junior NCOs				Enlisted
