= Quartermaster =

Army supply personnel or naval enlisted rating

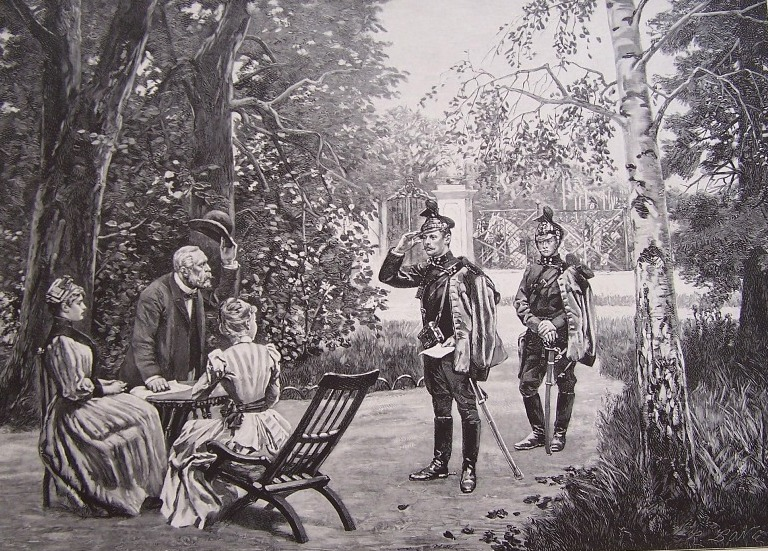
Wojciech Kossak, quartering (Quartermaster), circa 1893

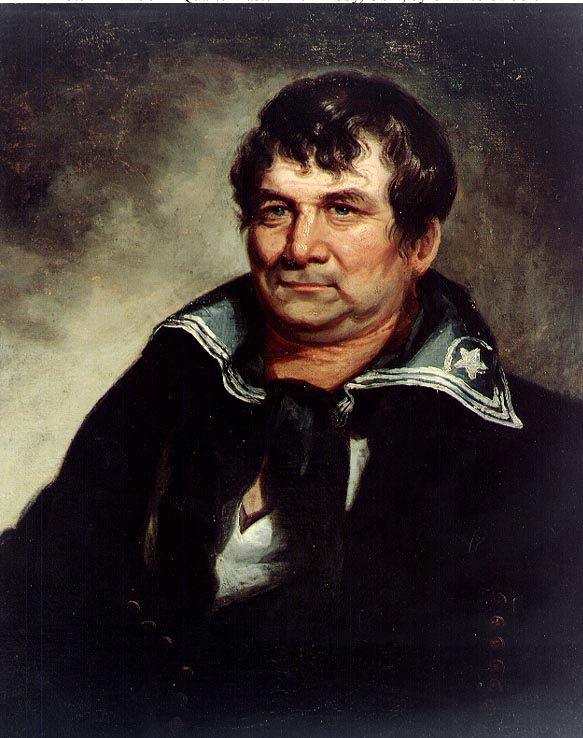
Quartermaster Dick Libby, USN. Portrait circa 1834

Quartermaster is a military term, the meaning of which depends on the country and service. In land armies, a quartermaster is an officer or enlisted soldier who supervises logistics and requisitions, manages stores or barracks, and distributes supplies and provisions. In many navies, a quartermaster is a seaman or petty officer with responsibility for navigation and operation of the helm of a ship.

The term appears to derive from the title of a German royal official, the Quartiermeister. This term meant "master of quarters" (where "quarters" refers to lodging or accommodation). Alternatively, it could have been derived from "master of the quarterdeck" where the helmsman and captain controlled the ship. The term's first use in English was as a naval term, which entered English in the 15th century via the equivalent French and Dutch naval titles quartier-maître and kwartier-meester, respectively. The term began to refer to army officers in English around 1600.

== Army use ==
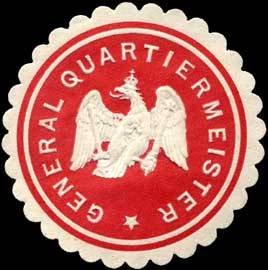
Seal of the Prussian Army Quartermaster General

For land armies, the term was coined in Germany as Quartiermeister and initially denoted a court official with the duty of preparing the monarch's sleeping quarters. In the 17th century, it started to be used in various militaries in the sense of organizing supplies.

=== Canada ===
From Royal Canadian Ordnance Corps standing orders:

For many centuries – indeed perhaps as long as there have been organized military units – the appointment of quartermaster has been significant in armies. Until recent times, the British Army almost invariably rewarded an outstanding RSM by appointing him quartermaster of his battalion, thus ensuring the unit an experienced officer who knew the unit thoroughly and would prove difficult to mislead or beguile. [The past tense is in fact incorrect, as the British Army still has this policy.] As the complexities of the Army and its material increased, an officer with greater professional technical knowledge of the problems that surround stores management was required for the Quartermaster's duties. Under authority of Canadian Army Order 201 – 16 dated 8 February 1954, the Royal Canadian Ordnance Corps assumed these responsibilities and undertook to train and provide unit quartermasters and staff for all corps of the Canadian Army (Regular) except the Royal Canadian Corps of Signals, Royal Canadian Army Medical Corps and Royal Canadian Dental Corps.

In recent years, the quartermaster has been a specially trained officer of the Royal Canadian Logistics Service, though CFR (commissioned from ranks) officers have been known to accept regimental appointments such as quartermaster.

=== Israel ===
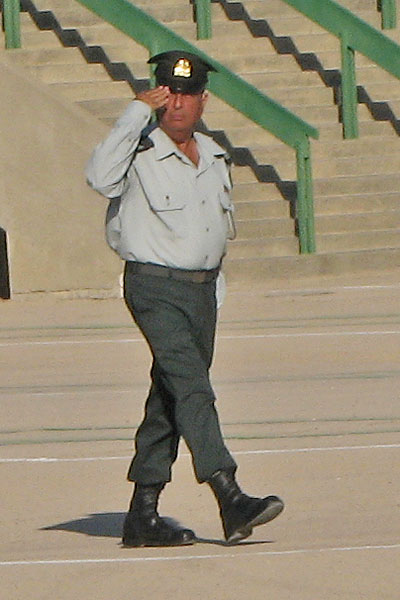
CWO Yitshak Taito, Rasar of IDF Officers' Academy

In the IDF, the battalion quartermaster is also the commander of the battalions support company, known as the battalion headquarters company. In the standing army he is usually a captain, but the role is a major's role. In the reserve army he is usually a major. While most of the staff officers are directly under the command of the battalion commander, the quartermaster has a lieutenant, a logistics officer and a junior ordnance officer (the battalion's ordnance platoon commander) under his direct command. He is in charge of all logistics issues in the battalion and also in charge of the battalion's headquarter's day-to-day life. He is commissioned as an officer by the ramatkal (the army's general chief of staff), and as a logistic officer by kalar (the army's general logistic officer). In large camps and higher headquarters (brigade, division and corps HQ), apart from the staff officer in charge of logistics, there is also a role defined mostly as "camp commander", who is in charge of the HQ logistic issues, ceremonies and parades and discipline. These duties differ slightly in the air force and navy. The ranks of IDF quartermasters vary from sergeant major to CWO, depending on the size of the camp. Most soldiers refer to him as rasar (the Hebrew acronym for the rank of 2WO) without regarding his actual rank. Quartermasters are identified (in all IDF branches) by a blue and white aiguillette on the left shoulder.

=== Switzerland ===
In the Swiss Army, a quartermaster (Qm) is an officer (from 2 Lt. to colonel) in charge with the coordination of the Kommissariatsdienst (accountancy, post-service, fuel resupply, "all sort of food" resupply and others) of a battalion, regiment and brigade/division. His function is more a control and supervision function: a staff officer for the respective commander. The Qm has a direct subordinate at company level: it is the company quartermaster sergeant. (Note: QMS – the English definition for international engagement and also a new grade insigni, see "Gradstrukturen der Armee XXI_revidiert" since 2001 on Swiss army ranks) The company quartermaster sergeant is known since the 18th century as Fourier or Einheits-Fourier and has the rank equivalent of a senior non-commissioned-officer like the company sergeant major (since 2001 company chief sergeant major, CMS) and they are ranked (for better understanding in NATO-ranks even though Switzerland, as a neutral state, is not part of NATO) OR-7 in the senior NCO's category (German: Höhere Unteroffiziere). For technical questions, the QMS is subordinated to the Qm officer (Qm 2 Lt, Qm 1 lt or Qm captain incorporated in the staff of a battalion/group). The tasks of resupply are assigned at company level to the two SNCO's (CSM and QMS). The QMS is the material executor of the Qm tasks at company level and for the command chain together with the CSM, directly subordinated to the company commander (captain) as staff NCOs. The Fourier is also the substitute of the chief sergeant major (Hauptfeldweibel), if considering the command platoon by itself.

=== United Kingdom ===
In the British Army and Royal Marines, the quartermaster (QM) is the commissioned officer in a battalion or regiment responsible for supply. By longstanding tradition, they are always commissioned from the ranks and hold the rank of captain or major (although until the 20th century the quartermaster was usually a lieutenant). Some units also have a technical quartermaster, who is in charge of technical stores. The quartermaster is assisted by the regimental quartermaster sergeant (RQMS) (and the technical quartermaster by the technical quartermaster sergeant (TQMS)) and a staff of storemen. The QM, RQMS and storemen are drawn from the regiment or corps in which they work, not from the Royal Logistic Corps (or its predecessors), which is responsible for issuing and transporting supplies to them. Units which specialize in supply are known as "supply" units, not "quartermaster" units, and their personnel as suppliers or logistics specialists ("log specs"). Traditionally, the quartermaster had previously served as RQMS and then regimental sergeant major (RSM) of the unit of which he later became quartermaster.

From at least the English Civil War period until 1813, the quartermaster was the senior NCO in a British cavalry troop, in which context he had nothing to do with supply. In that year, the position was replaced by the new appointment of troop sergeant major, with the cavalry adopting commissioned, regimental quartermasters as described above.

=== United States ===
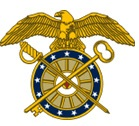
Branch Insignia as worn by Quartermaster Officers

In the United States Army, the term is used to describe all supply soldiers and units that are part of the United States Army Quartermaster Corps (USQMC), which was formerly the Quartermaster Department. It is a sustainment, formerly combat service support (CSS), branch of the United States Army. It is also one of three U.S. Army logistics branches, the others being the Transportation Corps and the Ordnance Corps.

== Navy use ==
=== Belgium ===
In Belgium, the naval ranks of quartermaster, chief quartermaster, and first chief quartermaster are used.

Rank group	OR-4		OR-3
Dutch	Eerste kwartiermeester-chef	Kwartiermeester-chef	Kwartiermeester
French	1er quartier-maître-chef	Quartier-maître-chef	Quartier maître
German	Erster oberquartiermeister	Oberquartiermeister	Quartiermeister

=== France ===
In the French Navy, Quartermaster (Quartier-maître) is a junior rank, equivalent to a French Army and Air Force Corporal. The French rank has nothing to do with supplies. This rank is also used by many other navies based on the French Navy.

	OR-4	OR-3
Shoulder		
Sleeve		
French	Quartier-maître de 1^{re} classe	Quartier-maître de 2^{e} classe
English translation	Quartermaster first class	Quartermaster second class

=== Norway ===
In the Norwegian navy, kvartermester is a rank equal to an army sergeant.

=== United Kingdom ===
In the Royal Navy and Commonwealth navies (Royal Canadian Navy, Royal Australian Navy, Royal New Zealand Navy, Indian Navy, and South African Navy), the quartermaster is the senior member of the gangway staff when the ship is alongside and is responsible for supervising the boatswain's mate and the security of the brow. They are also responsible for steering the ship while at sea.

=== United States ===
==== U.S. Navy ====
Quartermaster
- Rating insignia
- Issued by: United States Navy
- Type: Enlisted rating
- Abbreviation: QM
- Specialty: Operations/Navigation

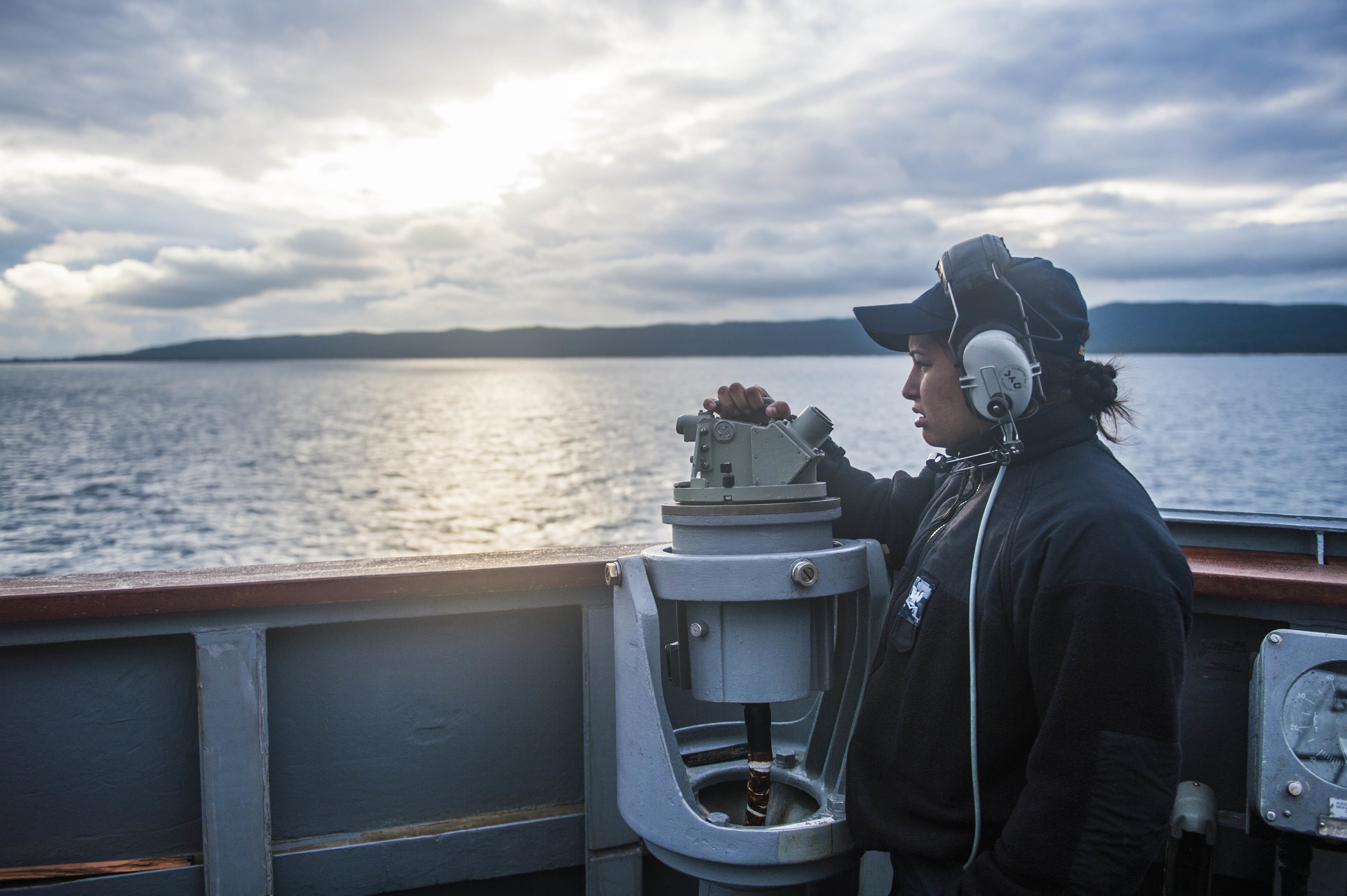
A U.S. Navy quartermaster taking a bearing in 2015.

The quartermaster is the enlisted member in charge of the watch-to-watch navigation and the maintenance, correction, and preparation of nautical charts and navigation publications. They are also responsible for navigational instruments and clocks and the training of ship's lookouts and helmsmen. They perform these duties under the control of the ship's navigator or other officer if there was no officer navigator. In the modern navy, a quartermaster is a petty officer who specializes in navigation. The rating abbreviation is QM. The symbol used for the rating and worn on uniforms is a ship's wheel. The colloquial form of address for a quartermaster is "Wheels".

On U.S. Navy submarines, the job of a quartermaster is done by a qualified navigation electronics technician (NAV-ET). Along with the job of a Navy surface QM, NAV-ETs are also responsible for electronic systems that deal with navigation, internal communications, atmosphere monitoring, ship's entertainment systems, re-circulatory air systems (ventilation) and remote valve indication or manipulation.

After 2004, the U.S. Navy disestablished the signalman rating (SM); signalmen were responsible for visual communications, and many of the personnel and their responsibilities were incorporated in the QM rating.

The U.S. Navy rating dealing with supply and logistics is logistics specialist (LS) which would be equivalent to the Army quartermaster.

==== U.S. Coast guard ====
The structure of ranks and job specialties of the United States Coast Guard is similar to that of the United States Navy. The Coast Guard used a quartermaster rating until the summer of 2003, when the rating was merged into the boatswain's mate rating.

The Coast Guard's quartermasters had the same duties as the Navy's, with the exception that—at some point after World War II—the Coast Guard folded the duties of its signalman rating into the quartermaster rating. Also, in recent decades, quartermaster was one of the only two Coast Guard enlisted ratings permitted to hold command of a small boat station (command otherwise being reserved for officers), with the other enlisted man's "command rating" being the boatswain's mate.

=== NATO code ===
While the rank is used in a number of NATO countries, it is ranked differently depending on the country.

NATO code	Country	English equivalent	
NATO code	Country	UK	U.S.
OR-5	Norway	Sergeant	Petty officer second class
OR-4	Belgium (chief and 1st chief), France (1st class), Netherlands	Leading rate	Petty officer third class
OR-3	Belgium, France (2nd class), Netherlands	—N/a	Seaman

=== Gallery ===
Kwartiermeester
French: Quartier maître
German: Quartiermeister
(Belgian Navy)

Kwartiermeester
(Royal Netherlands Navy)

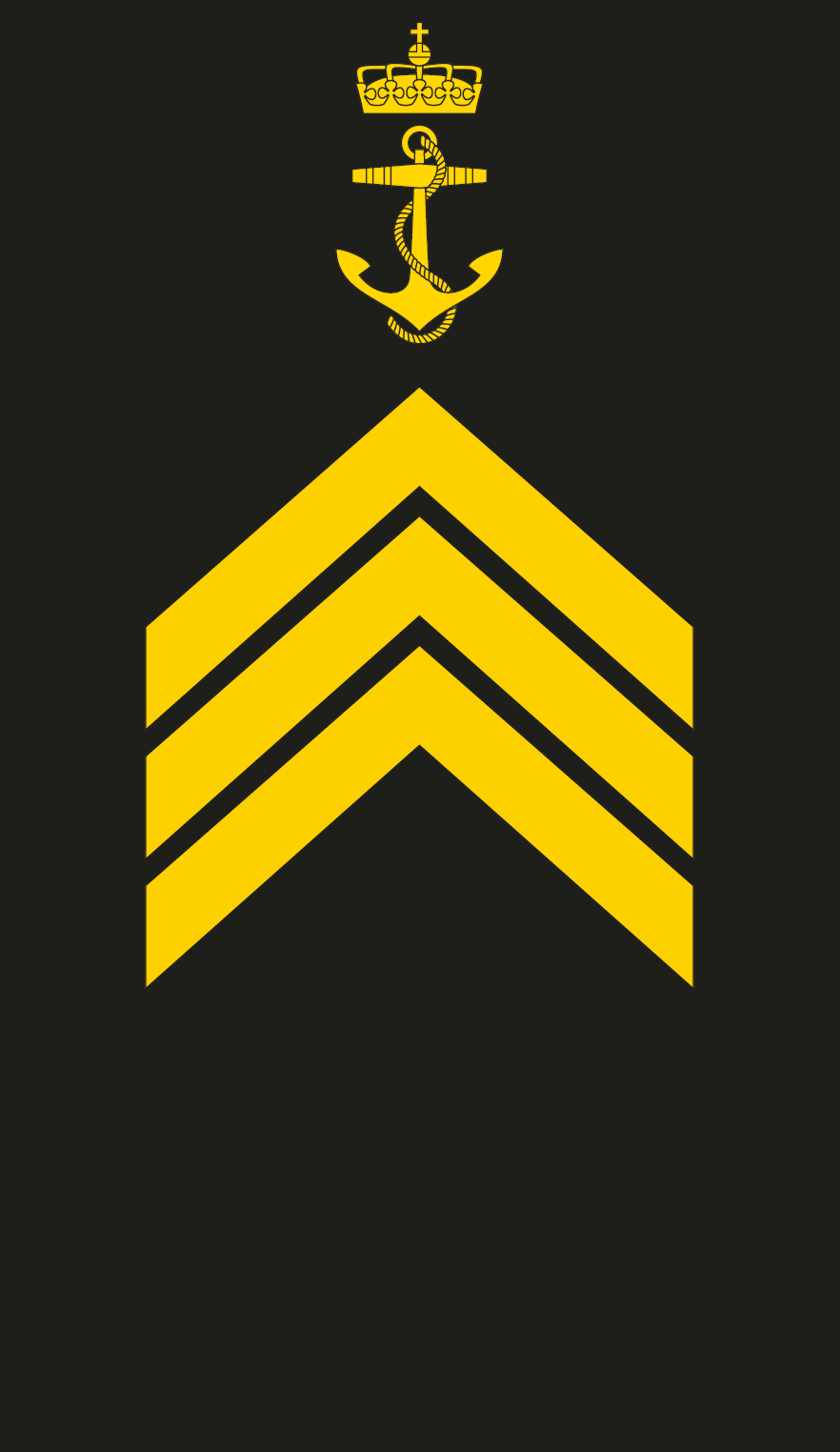
Kvartermester
(Royal Norwegian Navy)

== Piracy ==
Pirates during the Golden Age of Piracy elevated the rank of quartermaster to much higher powers and responsibilities than it had aboard non-pirate merchant or naval vessels. On pirate ships, the quartermaster was often granted a veto power by a pirate ship's "Articles of Agreement", in order to create an officer who could counterbalance the powers of the pirate captain. Pirate quartermasters, like pirate captains, were usually elected by their crews.

The quartermaster ranked higher than any other officer aboard the ship except the captain himself, and could veto the captain's decisions whenever the ship was not chasing a prize or engaged in battle. The quartermaster also was chiefly responsible for discipline, assessing punishments for crewmen who transgressed the articles.

According to pirate Captain Charles Johnson, ghost author of the 18th century source, A General History of the Robberies and Murders of the most notorious Pyrates, aboard a pirate ship "the Captain can undertake nothing which the Quarter-Master does not approve. We may say, the Quarter-Master is a humble Imitation of the Roman Tribune of the People; he speaks for, and looks after the Interest of the Crew".

Several quartermasters became captains after their previous captain was killed or deposed.

== Scouting ==
A Scout quartermaster within the Scout movement is responsible for maintaining all the normal camping supplies in a Scout troop or pack. This may include, but is not limited to, camping supplies, tents, "chuck boxes" (containers holding food and cooking supplies), stoves, camp fuel (propane, naphtha, etc.), tarps, camping trailers, dining flys, etc.

The Quartermaster Award is also the highest rank in the Sea Scouts, BSA, an older youth (age 13–21) co-ed program. A quartermaster (kwartiermeester) is in the Netherlands the assistant patrol leader of a Sea Scout patrol (Bak), in Flanders it is the patrol leader of a Sea Scout patrol (Kwartier).

== In popular culture ==
- Long John Silver, the charming and lethal one-legged pirate from the novel Treasure Island, had been the pirate version of quartermaster under Captain Flint. It was noted he was the one man Flint had been afraid of.
- The character Q in the James Bond franchise, who supplies Bond with all his gadgets, is named Q for Quartermaster.
- The Rooster Teeth animated web series, Camp Camp, features a character simply referred to as "Quartermaster".
- The characters of Nigel Nesbett and Louis Litt served as quartermasters in the basic cable USA Network series Suits where they oversaw office supplies and food and beverage provisions in the New York City law firm, Pearson Darby.
- The video game Tooth and Tail has a main character by the name of The Quartermaster.
- In British policing, the department that issues uniform and supplies is known informally as the Quartermasters ("QM").

== See also ==
- Intendant (government official)
- Quartermaster Center and School
- Quartermaster Corps
- Quartermaster general
- Army Quartermaster Museum
