= Unintentional discharge =

Discharging of a firearm at a time not intended by the user

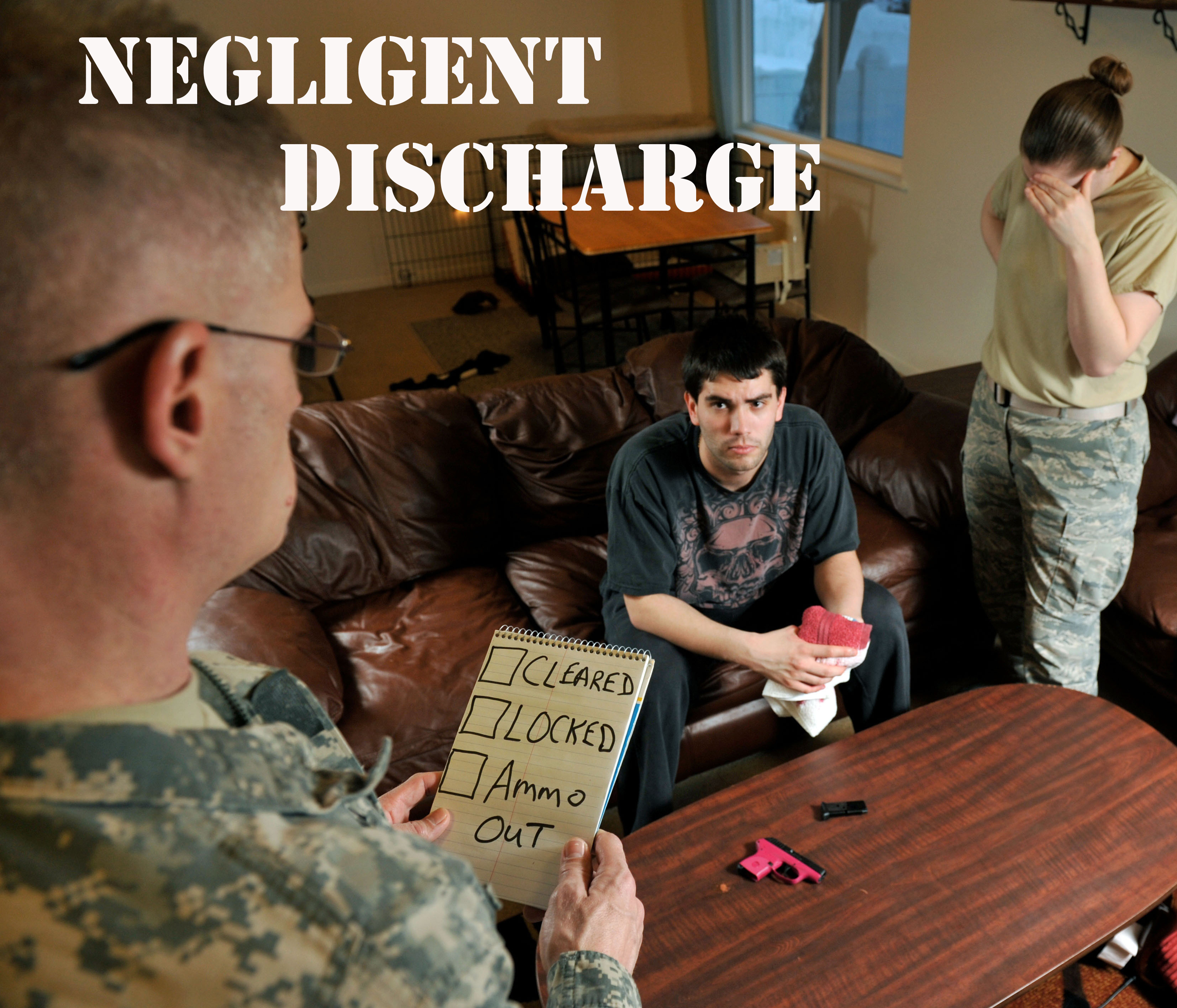
U.S. Air Force illustration demonstrating a simulated negligent discharge scenario in base housing

An unintentional discharge is the event of a firearm discharging (firing) at a time not intended by the user. An unintended discharge may be produced by an incompatibility between firearm design and usage, such as the phenomenon of cooking off a round in a closed bolt machine gun, a mechanical malfunction as in the case of slamfire in an automatic weapon, or be user induced due to training issues or negligence. The phenomenon has also been defined in scientific literature as an activation of the trigger mechanism that results in an unplanned discharge that is outside of the firearm’s prescribed use, where "prescribed use" refers to departmental policies and laws related to the operation of firearms (O'Neill, 2018).

== Types ==
=== Accidental discharge ===
An accidental discharge (AD) occurs when there is a mechanical failure of the firearm. This can include things like firearms that do not have mechanisms to render them drop safe falling a sufficient distance, a firing pin stuck forward, a sear failing, or rounds heating sufficiently to spontaneously ignite in the chamber (as may happen in a closed bolt machine gun).

=== Negligent discharge ===
A negligent discharge (ND) is a discharge of a firearm involving culpable carelessness. In judicial and military technical terms, a negligent discharge is a chargeable offence. The United States Army automatically considers any unintentional discharge to be negligent under the assumption that a trained soldier has control of his firearm at all times, but the United States Air Force only treats discharges as negligent "when a weapon is fired due to either operator error or a lack of attention to basic safety rules." The British military has several definitions of a negligent discharge, such as an "unauthorised and unintentional or inadvertent" initiation of small arms ammunition that is 9mm in calibre or less, "an individual fir[ing] without an order to do so", or "[a] weapon or pyrotechnic discharge, considered by the Conducting Officer or chain of command, to contravene the approved drills or procedures and contrary to the provisions in Queen's Regulations". JSP 830 defines a discharge as accidental if caused by a weaponry defect or negligent if caused by firer error. Even where a discharge is not negligent, "the prevalence of the phrase 'Negligent Discharge or ND' and a general assumption of its meaning" is such that it is used "as a comprehensive and colloquial phrase to describe any unintentional firing".

== See also ==
- Safety area
- Queen's Regulations and Orders for the Canadian Forces

== Notes ==
Forensic firearm examiners typically use more simplistic definitions limited to only two categories: unintentional discharge (no mechanical malfunction involved) and accidental discharge (mechanical malfunction involved).
