= Master corporal =

Military rank

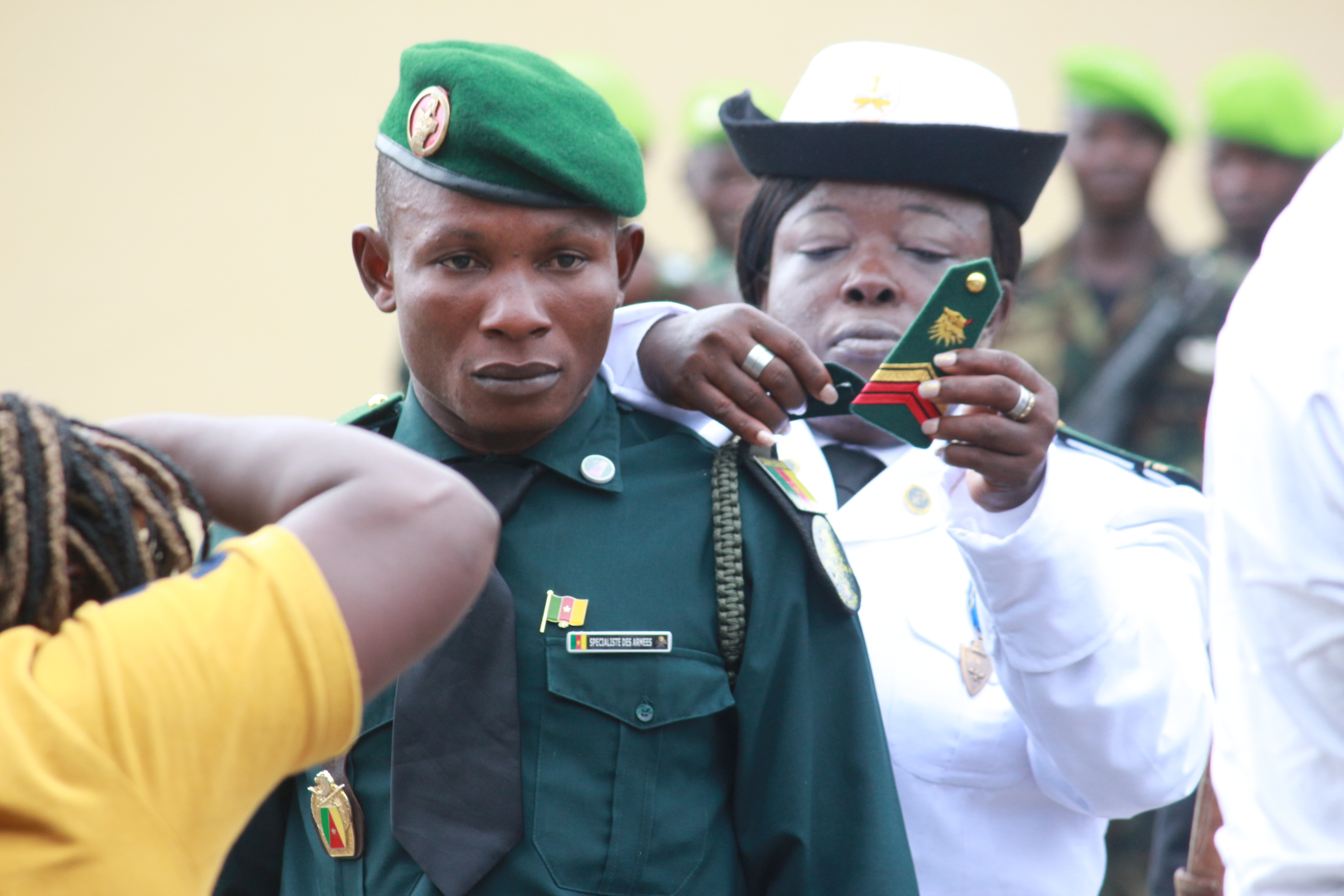
Caporal-chef in Cameroon Ground Forces uniform; shoulder board visible at right.

Master corporal (MCpl) (French: caporal-chef) is a military rank used by a number of countries. A master corporal ranks above corporal and below sergeant; its rank insignia is typically two red chevrons/stripes and one yellow chevron or stripe (possibly with an additional, thinner yellow chevron); in some countries three red chevrons are used.

== Canada ==
Master corporal Caporal-chef
- Country: Canada
- Service branch: Canadian Army; Royal Canadian Air Force
- Abbreviation: MCpl; CplC (in French)
- Rank group: Junior ranks
- NATO rank code: OR-4
- Next higher rank: Sergeant
- Next lower rank: Corporal
- Equivalent ranks: Master sailor

In the Canadian Armed Forces the displayed rank of master corporal (French: caporal-chef) is an appointment that can be granted to army and air force members of the rank of corporal. Its navy equivalent is master sailor (MS) (French: matelot-chef or matc).

According to the Queen's Regulations and Orders:

1. The Chief of the Defence Staff or such officer as he may designate may appoint a corporal as a master corporal.
2. The rank of a master corporal remains that of corporal.
3. Master corporals have seniority among themselves in their order of seniority as corporals.
4. Master corporals have authority and powers of command over all other corporals.

Master corporal, while formally an appointment, is treated as a de facto non-commissioned member rank, and is often described as such, even in official documents.

As mentioned above, the master corporal is senior to the corporal (and its naval counterpart, sailor first class (S1)). It is junior to the rank of sergeant (Sgt) and its equivalent naval rank, petty officer 2nd class (PO2). Master corporals and master sailors along with corporals and sailors first class make up the cadre of junior non-commissioned officers.

The rank insignia of a master corporal is a two-bar chevron, worn point down, surmounted by a maple leaf. Embroidered rank badges are worn in "CF gold" thread on rifle green (army) melton, or in silver on air force blue (air force) melton, stitched to the upper sleeves of the service dress jacket; as miniature gold metal and rifle-green enamel badges on the collars of the army dress shirt and army outerwear jackets; in "pearl-grey" (silver) thread on air force blue slip-ons on air force shirts, sweaters, and coats; and in white (army) or dark blue (air Force) thread on CADPAT slip-ons on the operational dress uniform. Insignia for mess uniform is determined by branch or regimental tradition.

Master corporals normally mess and billet with the junior ranks. Within most Canadian Army units, master corporals are commonly nicknamed "master jack" or "jack" by both superiors and subordinates. The nickname is derived from the former equivalent rank of lance corporal (still a rank in use with the Royal Canadian Army Cadets) or "lance jack". This is an informality and is used only within social context and never in formal proceedings. In general, only in closer working or socially comfortable units like rifle regiments or infantry units is this informal term commonly used. Master corporals are also frequently referred to as chef in Quebec, a reference to the French name of the rank, caporal-chef, which has also caused the term chief to be used by Quebec anglophone military members.

=== History ===
The master corporal appointment came into existence after the unification of the Canadian Forces in 1968. A power vacuum was inadvertently created when private soldiers were promoted to the rank of corporal as an incentive for continuing in the Forces at a time when Unification was introduced by Defence Minister Paul Hellyer, who promoted all privates with requisite time in service to what was originally a leadership rank (corporal) in the army. Eventually, corporals who had passed the "B" phase of their leadership training took to wearing a crown over their chevrons, and this arrangement was eventually formalized by having a maple leaf replace the crown, and the new "'B' corporals", as they were known, became master corporals.

=== Responsibilities ===
The rank, formally an appointment as a senior corporal, gives the MCpl authority over all privates and corporals. As such, a MCpl is a first-level supervisor who is assessed on his/her ability to manage and develop subordinates. Given the structure of the Canadian infantry platoon, the MCpl is roughly equivalent to the British rank of corporal, second in command of an infantry section; because MCpls often command sections and occupy various NCO positions, and because trained leadership is retained at a lower level (section) than in other militaries, it is more realistic to equate MCpls with the British, Australian and New Zealand rank of senior corporal and just under sergeant.

=== Requirements ===
The general requirements for appointment to master corporal include a Qualification Level 5 course (known as a journeyman course in some trades), a primary leadership qualification course (PLQ), and a time in the rank of corporal for a minimum of two years. For combat arms trades (except for the infantry), the Army Junior Leadership Course (AJLC) is also required.

However, certain trades have their own particular qualifications in addition to the above. For example, infantry combines the Qualification Level 5B course, Qualification Level 6A, and Junior Leader's course in a single Infantry Section Commander's Course. In addition, to be appointed to master corporal an infantry soldier must have successfully completed a machine gunner's specialization course.

Master corporals often serve as training non-commissioned officers for the purposes of training new soldiers, sailors and aviators. They are often a new recruit's first taste of military life.

== French speaking nations ==
=== France ===
	OR-4	
	Army	Air force
Shoulder		
Camouflage		
French	Caporal-chef de 1^{re} classe	Caporal-chef
English translation	Chief corporal first class	Chief corporal

=== Other nations ===
Caporal-chef
(Arabic: عريف أول, romanized: Earif 'awal)
(Algerian Land Forces)

Korporaal-chef
(French: Caporal-chef)
(Belgian Land Component)

Caporal-chef
(Benin Army)

Caporal-chef
(Burkina Faso Ground Forces)

Caporal-chef
(Kirundi: Kaporari shefu)
(Burundi Army)

Caporal-chef
(Cameroon Ground Forces)

Caporal-chef
(Central African Ground Forces)

Caporal-chef
(Comorian Army)

Caporal-chef
(Congolese Ground Forces)

Caporal-chef
(Djiboutian Army)

Caporal-chef
(Gabonese Army)

Caporal-chef
(Guinea Ground Forces)

Caporal-chef
(Ivory Coast Ground Forces)

Caporal-chef
(Madagascar Ground Forces)

Caporal-chef
(Malian Army)

Caporal-chef
(Royal Moroccan Army)

Caporal-chef
(Niger Army)

Caporal-chef
(Senegalese Army)

Caporal-chef
(Togolese Army)

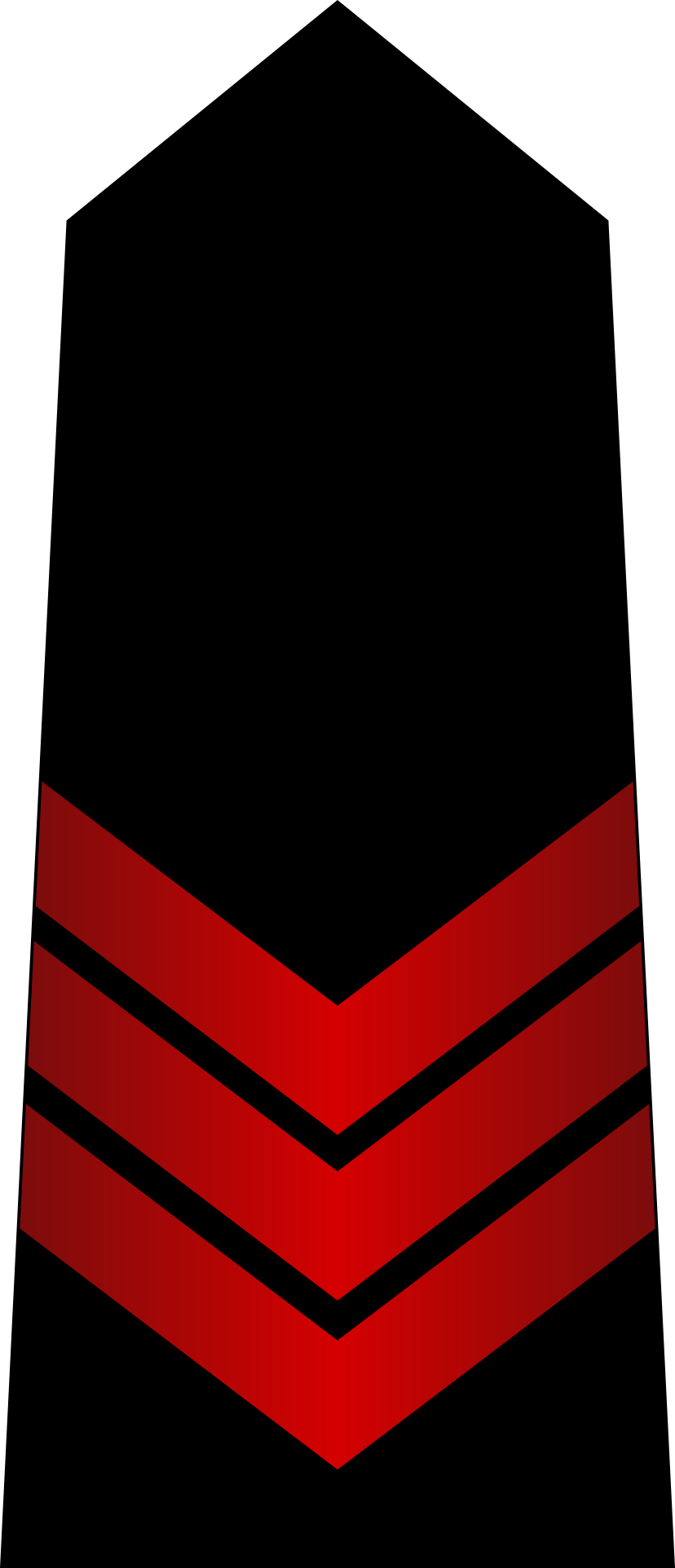
Caporal-chef
(Arabic: رقيب أول, romanized: Raqib 'awal)
(Tunisian Army)

== Indonesia ==
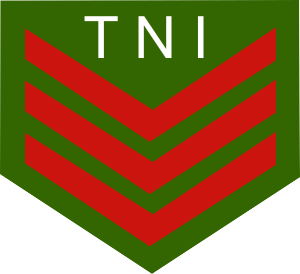
The Master Corporal rank insignia of the Indonesian Army

In the Indonesian Military, the rank "Master Corporal" is known as Kopral Kepala (Kopka). In Indonesia, "Corporal" has three levels, which are: Lance Corporal, Corporal, and Master Corporal.

== See also ==
- Canadian Armed Forces ranks and insignia
