= Junior ranks =

Junior ranks is the collective term in the Canadian Armed Forces for all the non-commissioned members ranked below that of sergeant/petty officer 2nd class; in other words, all junior non-commissioned officers and privates. The Army and Air Force ranks, followed by the equivalent Naval ranks, in descending order, are as follows:

- Master corporal / master seaman
- Corporal / leading seaman
- Private (trained) / able seaman
- Private (basic) or private (recruit) / ordinary seaman
