= Canadian Forces Administrative Orders =

Canadian Forces Administrative Orders (CFAOs) are issued to

supplement and amplify the Queen's Regulations and Orders (QR&O)...[they] contain administrative policy, procedures and information of continuing effect. CFAO 1-1

They are contained in a database allowing CAF members to search information on a variety of topics regarding their profession, among other things policies and administrative procedures. It is available online for quick access. This collection is presented alphabetically, making it easier for users to jump to specific topics.

CFAOs are currently in the process of being superseded by Defence Administrative Orders and Directives (DAODs), manuals and other publications, or are being cancelled as required. As such, the CFAOs are no longer being amended and no new CFAOs are being written. CFAOs remain in effect where there is not yet a relevant DAOD.

== See also ==
- Queen's Regulations and Orders
