= Master sailor =

Non-commissioned member rank of the Royal Canadian Navy

Master Sailor Matelot-chef
- Country: Canada
- Service branch: Royal Canadian Navy
- Abbreviation: MS; matc (in French)
- Rank group: Junior ranks
- NATO rank code: OR-4
- Next higher rank: Petty officer second class
- Next lower rank: Sailor first class
- Equivalent ranks: Master corporal

Master sailor, formerly Master seaman, or matelot-chef (matc) in French, is a non-commissioned member rank of the Royal Canadian Navy, which is between sailor first class and petty officer 2nd class. Technically, the rank is actually an appointment, with appointees holding the rank of sailor first class. If demoted, a master sailor will become a sailor second class or sailor first class depending on seniority. However, the process to be appointed is very similar to that of a promotion, and holding the appointment of master sailor is a prerequisite to promotion to PO2.

A contributing factor to the confusion of 'appointment' vs 'promotion' is that when promoted/appointed to master sailor, the sailor enters a new pay scale, unlike appointment to sailor second class, wherein the sailor has simply entered a new incentive level within the pay scale for ordinary sailors (sailors third class).

A master sailor is equal to a master corporal of the Canadian Army and the Royal Canadian Air Force.

The rank of master sailor is sometimes referred to as "master killick", from "killick", the slang for sailor first class. Those personnel junior to the master sailor, however, are advised to refrain from addressing the holder by that term.

In September 2020 the name of the rank was changed from master seaman to master sailor as part of a change to gender-neutral rank names.
