= King's Regulations =

Regulations for the British armed forces

The King's Regulations (first published in 1731 and known as the Queen's Regulations when the monarch is female) is a collection of orders and regulations in force in the Royal Navy, British Army, Royal Air Force, and Commonwealth Realm Forces (where the same person as on the British throne is also their separate head of state), forming guidance for officers of these armed services in all matters of discipline and personal conduct. Originally, a single set of regulations were published in one volume. By the mid 19th century, there were separate editions of the Queen's Regulations for the Navy and the Army, and there is now one for each of the United Kingdom's armed forces.

== History ==
The first issue of what became the Queen's Regulations and Admiralty Instructions was issued in 1731 as the Regulations and Instructions Relating to His Majesty's Service at Sea. Numerous further editions have appeared since then, and from the 19th century the title was altered to the Queen's [or King's] Regulations and Admiralty Instructions. Naval editions with this title were published by H.M. Stationery Office as recently as 1959 and 1964.

In 1868, Chambers's Encyclopaedia noted that the Queen's Regulations for the Navy "in a great degree regulate matters of finance; whereas, in the army, financial matters are left to the War Office regulations".

The historian of the British Empire Edward Jenks wrote in 1918 that:

The King cannot, by Articles of War, alter the provisions of an Act of Parliament. The "King's Regulations", therefore, are concerned mainly with the minor affairs of military life, such as the soldier's uniform and equipment, the etiquette of the barracks and the mess-room, the formalities required in communicating with the authorities, and so on.

In a legal work of 1907, Sir Frederick Pollock defined the "King's Regulations and Orders for the Army and Navy" thus:

The Crown issues regulations and orders for the government, discipline, and general economy of the military and naval forces—regular, reserve, and volunteer—under the sign manual of the Sovereign.

Under "King's Regulations and Orders for the Army", Herbert Mason states

The orders of the Sovereign affecting any fundamental matter of agreement between the Sovereign and a soldier are communicated by Royal warrants, which are signed by the Under-Secretary of State for War and reproduced in detail in Army Circulars. These circulars supplement and are incorporated in the Revised Army Regulations... They carry out and supplement the statutory provisions already existing".

== Prohibition of political discussions ==
It has been a matter of discipline since at least the 1844 edition of Wellington that,

Officers, Non-commissioned Officers, and Soldiers are forbidden to institute, countenance, or attend Orange-Lodges, or any other Meetings whatever, for Party or Political Purposes, in Barracks, Quarters, Camp, or wheresoever held.

In 1889, Sir Garnet Wolseley amended the prohibition to read,

Officers, Non-commissioned Officers, and private soldiers are forbidden to institute, or take part in any meetings, demonstrations, or processions for party or political purposes, in barracks, quarters or camps, or their vicinity; and under no circumstances whatever will they do so in uniform.

== Current editions ==
- The Queen's Regulations for the Royal Navy (1997)
- The Queen's Regulations for the Army (1975)
- The Queen's Regulations for the Royal Air Force (1999)

Frequent updates are issued.

== Selected past editions ==
Army

- General Orders and Regulations (Calvert ed. - Temple Bar, London: C. Roworth, 1804)
- The Queen's regulations and orders for the Army (Wellington ed. - London: Parker, Furnivall, and Parker, 3rd ed., 1844)
- The Queen's regulations and orders for the Army - Part I (Wolseley ed. - War Office, London: HMSO 1889)
- The King's Regulations and Orders for the Army (London: HM Stationery Office, 1901)
- The King's Regulations and Orders for the Army (London: HM Stationery Office, 1908)
- The King's Regulations and Orders for the Army (London: HM Stationery Office, 1912)

Navy

- Regulations and Instructions relating to His Majesty's service at sea. (London, 1731; 1st ed)
- Regulations and Instructions relating to His Majesty's service at sea. (London, 1734; 2nd ed)
- Regulations and Instructions relating to His Majesty's service at sea. (London, 1757; 9th ed)
- Regulations and Instructions relating to His Majesty's service at sea. (London, 1790; 13th ed)
- Regulations and Instructions relating to His Majesty's service at sea. (London, 1806)
- The Queen's Regulations and Admiralty Instructions for the Government of Her Majesty's Naval Service (London: HMSO, 1862)
- The King's Regulations and Admiralty Instructions for the Government of His Majesty's Naval Service, 2 volumes (London: HM Stationery Office, 1906). Vol I
- The King's Regulations and Admiralty Instructions for the Government of His Majesty's Naval Service, 2 volumes (London: HM Stationery Office, 1913). Vol I
- The King's Regulations and Admiralty Instructions for the Government of His Majesty's Naval Service, 2 volumes (London: HM Stationery Office, 1914)
- The King's Regulations and Admiralty Instructions for the Government of His Majesty's Naval Service, 2 volumes (London: HM Stationery Office, 1939)

RAF

- The King's regulations and orders for the Royal Air Force. (London: HM Stationery Office, 1918)

== See also ==
- Queen's Regulations and Orders for the Canadian Forces
