= Code of Service Discipline =

Basis of the Canadian Forces military justice system

The Code of Service Discipline (CSD) is the basis of the Canadian Forces military justice system. The CSD is designed to assist military commanders in maintaining discipline, efficiency, and morale within the Canadian Forces (CF). It is found in Part III of the National Defence Act. The CSD:

- sets out who is subject to the military justice system
- establishes service offences for which a person can be charged
- establishes who has the authority to arrest and hold CF members in custody
- establishes service tribunals and their jurisdiction to conduct trials of persons charged with service offences
- establishes processes for the review and appeal of findings and sentence after trial

== Reasons for existence ==
The need for a separate justice system to enforce disciplinary standards in the military has a history that dates back to the earliest organized military forces. More recently, the Supreme Court of Canada, in R v Généreux, recognized the continuing need for a separate system of military justice. The Supreme Court stated that Canada depends on the CF to defend against threats to its security and the military must be able to enforce discipline effectively and efficiently in order to maintain its readiness. Accordingly, breaches of discipline must be dealt with speedily and will often result in more severe punishments than what a civilian might receive for the same conduct. The Supreme Court acknowledged that military tribunals are designed to meet the disciplinary needs of the CF and that the ordinary courts would generally be inadequate to serve the particular needs of the military. For example, both summary trials and courts martial can be held wherever forces are deployed. In November 2015, the Supreme Court essentially confirmed its R v Généreux ruling.

== Applicability ==
All members of the CF Regular Force are always subject to the CSD, both inside and outside Canada. Members of the Primary Reserve Force are subject to the CSD:

- while undergoing drill or training (whether in uniform or not)
- whenever they are in uniform
- while on any military duty
- 24 hours a day, 7 days a week during any period of full-time service (Class "B" or "C" service) with a full-time unit.
- whenever they are present on defence property
- whenever they are in a vehicle, ship or aircraft of the CF

== See also ==
- Uniform Code of Military Justice, an American equivalent to the Code of Service Discipline
