= Queen's Regulations and Orders for the Canadian Forces =

Regulations for the Canadian Forces

The Queen's Regulations and Orders for the Canadian Forces (QR&O) are regulations having the force of law for the governance of the Canadian Forces. They are regarded as the primary document of military law and regulations in Canada – aside from the National Defence Act.

The titling of these regulations currently remains unchanged after the death of Queen Elizabeth II.

== Authority ==
The QR&O are issued under the authority of Section 12 of the National Defence Act (NDA), the governing statute of the Canadian Forces. Section 12 provides the Governor in Council (i.e., the Governor General acting on the advice of Cabinet) and the Minister of National Defence with the power to make regulations for the "organization, training, discipline, efficiency, administration, and government of the Forces", so long as such regulations are not inconsistent with the NDA, common-law principles of natural justice, the Canadian Bill of Rights or the Canadian Charter of Rights and Freedoms; it also permits the Treasury Board to make regulations concerning pay, allowances, forfeitures, deductions, etc.

QR&O 1.23 further authorizes the Chief of Defence Staff (CDS) to issue orders and instructions "not inconsistent with the National Defence Act or with any regulations made by the Governor in Council, the Treasury Board or the Minister" in the discharge of his duties or in implementation/explanation of regulations.

Each regulation or order within the QR&O is, as noted above, issued under the authority of the Governor in Council, the Minister, Treasury Board, or CDS; the issuing authority is indicated by a letter in parentheses following each regulation or order, namely (G), (M), (T), and (C), respectively.

== Volumes ==
The QR&O is divided into four volumes, containing the indicated chapters:

- Volume I – Administrative (Chapters 1 through 100)
- Volume II – Disciplinary (Chapters 101 through 200)
- Volume III – Financial (Chapters 201 through 300)
- Volume IV – Appendices

=== Volume I – Administrative ===
Volume I contains the most wide-ranging subject matter. It contains regulations and orders for the CF to cover almost every aspect of military life, from enrolment to release, and all items in between. It comprises the following chapters:

Ch. 1 – Introduction and Definitions
Ch. 2 – Government and Organization
Ch. 3 – Rank, Seniority, Command and Precedence
Ch. 4 – Duties and Responsibilities of officers
Ch. 5 – Duties and Responsibilities of Non-Commissioned Members
Ch. 6 – Enrolment and Re-Engagement
Ch. 7 – Grievances
Ch. 8 – (Not Allocated)
Ch. 9 – Reserve Service
Ch. 10 – Transfer, Attachment, Secondment and Loan
Ch. 11 – Promotion, Reversion and Compulsory Remustering
Ch. 12 – Promotion of Officers
Ch. 13 – (Not Allocated)
Ch. 14 – Promotion and Reclassification of Non-Commissioned Members
Ch. 15 – Release
Ch. 16 – Leave
Ch. 17 – Dress and Appearance
Ch. 18 – Honours
Ch. 19 – Conduct and Discipline
Ch. 20 – Canadian Forces Drug Control Program
Ch. 21 – Summary Investigations and Boards of Inquiry
Ch. 22 – Military Police and Reports on Persons in Custody
Ch. 23 – Duties in Aid of the Civil Power
Ch. 24 – Casualties and Funerals
Ch. 25 – Service Estates and Personal Belongings
Ch. 26 – Personal Records and Documents
Ch. 27 – Messes, Canteens and Institutes
Ch. 28 – Allotment and Occupation of Quarters
Ch. 29 – Works and Buildings
Ch. 30 – Fire Protection Services
Ch. 31 – (Repealed)
Ch. 32 – Bands
Ch. 33 – Chaplain Services
Ch. 34 – Medical Services
Ch. 35 – Dental Services
Ch. 36 – Materiel and Provision of Services
Ch. 37 – (Not Allocated)
Ch. 38 – Liability for Public and Non-Public Property
Ch. 39 to 100 (Not Allocated)

=== Volume II – Disciplinary ===
Volume II amplifies the Code of Service Discipline and is the authoritative manual for military law in Canada. It contains the regulations governing the commission of service offences (ranging from treason to negligent discharges) and the prosecution and punishment thereof, from summary trials to the various kinds of court-martial. It comprises the following chapters:

Ch. 101 – General Provisions Respecting the Code of Service Discipline
Ch. 102 – Disciplinary Jurisdiction
Ch. 103 – Service Offences
Ch. 104 – Punishments and Sentences
Ch. 105 – Arrest and Pre-trial Custody
Ch. 106 – Investigation of Service Offences
Ch. 107 – Preparation, Laying and Referral of Charges
Ch. 108 – Summary Proceedings
Ch. 109 – Application for Referral Authority for Disposal of a Charge
Ch. 110 – Action by Director of Military Prosecutions in Respect of Charges
Ch. 111 – Convening of Courts Martial and Pre-trial Administration
Ch. 112 – Procedure at Courts Martial
Ch. 113 – REPEALED 1 SEPTEMBER 1999
Ch. 114 – General Provisions Respecting Imprisonment and Detention
Ch. 115 – Appeals from Courts Martial
Ch. 116 – Review Of Findings and Punishments
Ch. 117 – New Trials
Ch. 118 – Release from Detention or Imprisonment Pending Appeal from Court Martial
Ch. 119 – Mental Disorder
Ch. 120 to 200 (Not Allocated)

=== Volume III – Financial ===
Volume III lays out the framework of regulations that govern the financial issues of the CF, including pay, allotments, deductions, expenses, etc. It comprises the following chapters:

Ch. 201 – Duties and Responsibilities of Accounting Officers
Ch. 202 – Cash Accounts and Banking Arrangements
Ch. 203 – Financial Benefits – Generally
Ch. 204 – Financial Benefits and Pay of Military Judges amended
Ch. 205 – Allowances for Officers and Non-Commissioned Members
Ch. 206 – Pension Deductions, Contributions and Gratuities
Ch. 207 – Pay Allotments and Compulsory Payments
Ch. 208 – Fines, Forfeitures And Deductions
Ch. 209 – Transportation and Travelling Expenses
Ch. 210 – Miscellaneous Entitlements and Grants

=== Volume IV – Appendices ===
Volume IV contains supplementary rules and regulations. It also contains the texts of the NDA, the Security of Information Act, and other applicable Acts of Parliament. It comprises the following appendices:

PART I – CANADIAN FORCES
1.1 – National Defence Act
1.2 – Court Martial Appeal Rules
1.3 – Military Rules of Evidence
1.4 – Regulations for Service Prisons and Detention Barracks
1.5 – Prisoner-of-War Status Determination Regulations
1.6 – National Defence Claims Regulations, 1970
PART II – VISITING FORCES
2.1 – Visiting Forces Act
2.2 – Visiting Forces Regulations
2.3 – Visiting Forces Attachment and Serving Together Regulations
2.4 – Agreement Between the Parties to the North Atlantic Treaty Regarding the Status of their Forces
PART III – SECURITY
3.1 – Security of Information Act
3.2 – Defence Controlled Access Area Regulations
3.3 – Inspection and Search Defence Regulations
3.4 – Government Property Traffic Regulations
PART IV – FINANCIAL
4.1 – Charges for Family Housing Regulations
4.2 – (REPEALED)
4.3 – (REPEALED)
4.4 – Retroactive Remuneration Regulations – Canadian Forces
PART V – RETIREMENT BENEFITS
5.1 – Canadian Forces Superannuation Act
5.2 – Canadian Forces Superannuation Regulations
5.3 – Supplementary Retirement Benefits Act
PART VI – CANADIAN MILITARY COLLEGES
6.1 – Queens's Regulations and Orders for the Canadian Military Colleges (new format)
PART VII – MILITARY POLICY
7.1 – Military Police Professional Code of Conduct
7.2 – Complaints About the Conduct of Members of the Military Police Regulations

== See also ==
- Canadian Armed Forces
- Canadian Forces Administrative Orders
- Code of Service Discipline
- National Defence Act
- Order in Council
- King's Regulations
