= 2011 Helmand Province killing =

Killing of a Taliban insurgent

Map of Afghanistan with Helmand highlighted

The 2011 Helmand Province killing was the manslaughter of a wounded Taliban insurgent by British Royal Marine Sergeant Alexander Wayne Blackman on 15 September 2011. Blackman and two other Royal Marines, Corporal Christopher Glyn Watson and Marine Jack Alexander Hammond, known during their trial as Marines A, B, and C, were anonymously tried by court martial for the killing. On 8 November 2013, Watson and Hammond were acquitted, while Blackman was found guilty of murder of the Afghan insurgent in contravention of section 42 of the Armed Forces Act 2006. This made him the first British soldier to be convicted of a battlefield murder whilst serving abroad since World War II.

On 6 December 2013, Blackman was sentenced to life imprisonment with a minimum term of ten years before being eligible of parole, and dismissed with disgrace from the Royal Marines. On 22 May 2014, the Courts Martial Appeal Court reduced his minimum term to eight years.

A campaign in the Armed Forces community tried to have his conviction overturned, led by Claire Blackman and the MP for South Dorset, Richard Drax. During the campaign to free him, the Criminal Cases Review Commission concluded that Blackman's defence team fell "way below the standard expected". At the subsequent appeal hearing in 2017, the conviction was overturned and the hearing stated that "At the time of the killing the patrol remained under threat from other insurgents... Given his prior exemplary conduct, we have concluded that it was the combination of the stressors, the other matters to which we have referred and his adjustment disorder that substantially impaired his ability to form a rational judgment."

In March 2017, the conviction for murder was overturned and reduced to manslaughter on the grounds of diminished responsibility. Blackman was released from prison on 28 April 2017 but his dismissal from the Marines remains in place.

== Incident ==
The incident took place in Helmand Province during Operation Herrick 14, part of the British effort in the War in Afghanistan. Blackman, of J company, 42 Commando, was part of a Royal Marine patrol that came across an Afghan fighter in a field wounded by Apache helicopter gunfire. Blackman ordered the Afghan to be moved out of sight of the Kestrel surveillance system, a camera on a balloon above British Forward Operating Base Shazad, Helmand, covering the area Blackman's patrol had been sent to. Video evidence played at the Marines' subsequent trial shows some of the patrol dragging the man across the field and then kicking him. Blackman ordered Corporal Christopher Glyn Watson and Marine Jack Alexander Hammond to stop administering first aid to the insurgent and eventually shot the man in the chest with a 9 mm pistol, saying: "Shuffle off this mortal coil, you cunt. It's nothing you wouldn't do to us." He then added: "I just broke the Geneva Convention."

== Criminal trial, appeals, and sentencing ==
After the 15 September incident, Blackman continued with his tour of duty, leaving Helmand Province in late October 2011. On 13 October 2012, at the decision of the Service Prosecution Authority, Blackman, Watson, Hammond, Marines D and E were charged with the murder of the unnamed Afghan insurgent. The lead came after British civilian police discovered suspicious video footage on a serviceman's laptop. Marines D and E had charges against them dropped on 5 February 2013. Blackman, Watson and Hammond first appeared in court in August 2013, where they entered a not guilty plea. The military trial began on 23 October 2013 at the Military Court Centre in Bulford, Wiltshire, protected from view in court behind a screen because of an anonymity order, where Blackman, Watson and Hammond were identified in court papers as Marines A, B, and C respectively, and lasted two weeks in front of Judge Advocate General Jeff Blackett, with a seven-members Court Martial board (equivalent to a jury in the civilian justice system) instead of the usual five.

The verdict was delivered on 8 November 2013 and it carried a mandatory life sentence, so it was only in the judge advocate's and Court Martial board's power to decide on the minimum sentence needed to be served before eligibility for parole once the board had found only Blackman guilty. Thus, he was sentenced to a minimum of 10 years imprisonment on 6 December 2013. On 22 May 2014, at the Courts Martial Appeal Court, Lord Chief Justice Lord Thomas reduced Blackman's minimum term to 8 years.

In December 2016 Blackman was denied bail pending a second appeal due to be heard by the Court Martial Appeal Court. On 15 March 2017, the court reduced the conviction to manslaughter on the grounds of diminished responsibility. British newspaper The Guardian reported that, "Outside court Blackman's wife, Claire, who has led the campaign to free the former sergeant, said she was delighted by the result saying it 'much better reflected the circumstances that [her] husband found himself in during that terrible tour of Afghanistan'."

On 28 March 2017, Blackman was given a 7-year sentence for manslaughter with diminished responsibility, but was given credit for time served, and was freed on 28 April 2017.

== Anonymity orders ==
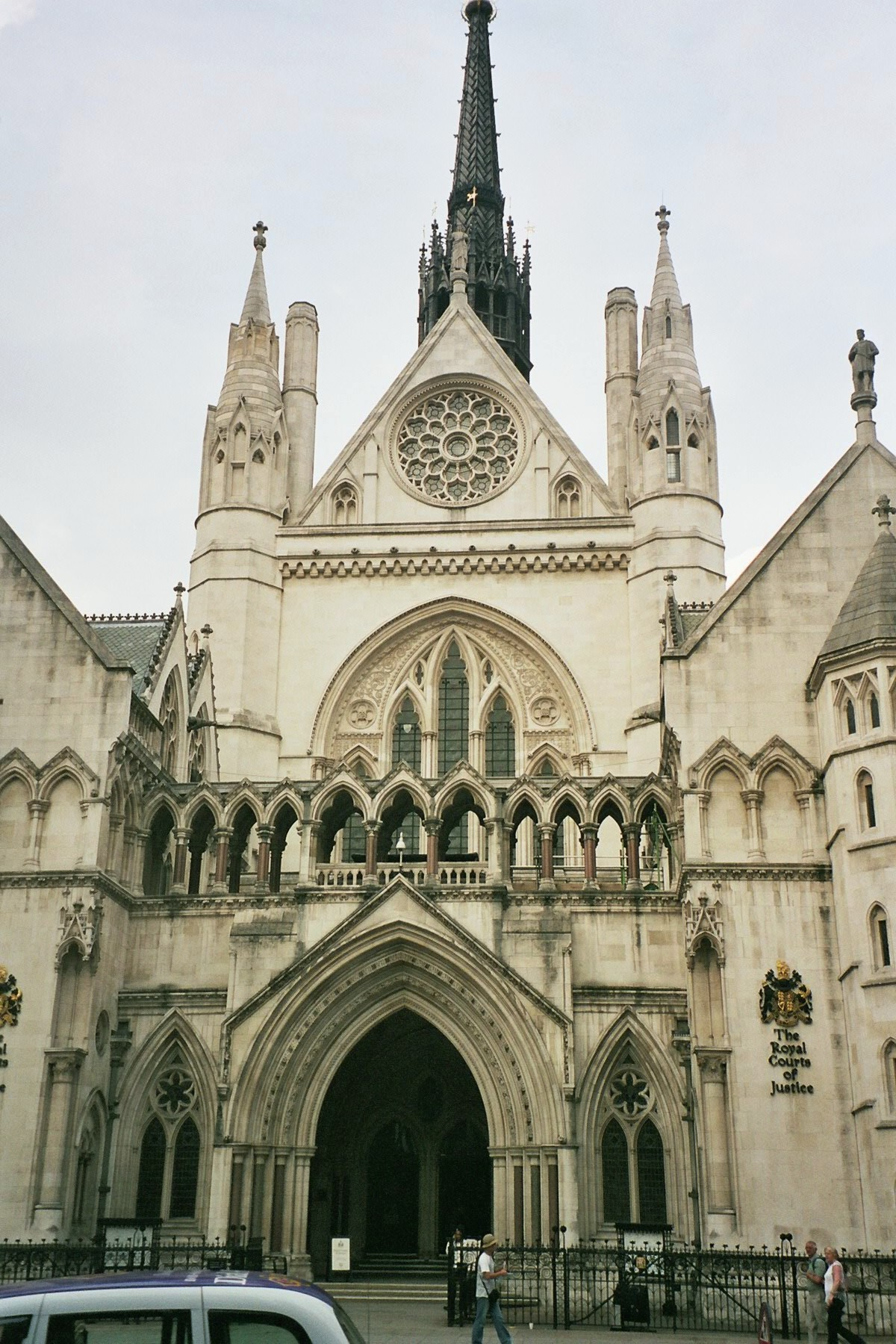
The Law Courts building, housing the High Court, which issued a ruling leading to three of the Marines involved being publicly named

Running in parallel to the Marines' criminal trial were legal proceedings relating to the anonymity of the defendants. In the autumn of 2012, Judges Advocate Elsom and Blackett issued anonymity orders for the Marine defendants due to the risk that, once named, the defendants would become targets for terrorists. The move had been opposed by elements of the UK media. A lawyer for the Press Association argued that anonymity orders should not be issued in this case because British military award recipients named in the media had not been previously targeted; and that the names of those British service personnel investigated following the death of Baha Mousa had not been similarly protected. The anonymity orders were upheld at the beginning of the trial in October 2013.

On 5 December 2013, Lord Chief Justice Lord Thomas and two other High Court judges lifted the existing anonymity order on Blackman. The same ruling had it that the anonymity order on Watson and Hammond also be lifted unless they submit an appeal to the Supreme Court. No such appeal was lodged within the set deadline, thus on 19 December 2013, both Watson and Hammond's identity were revealed. The anonymity of Marines D and E was upheld on 19 December "pending any further order by the Judge Advocate General".

Blackett also restricted public access to the evidence used at the trial, releasing on 8 November stills, audio clips and transcripts from the serviceman's video that was played to the Court Martial board, but ruling that the full video itself not be released, since doing so "would increase the threat of harm to British service personnel." On 5 December 2013, the Court Martial Appeal Court upheld the earlier decisions prohibiting the release of the video footage of the attack and some of the stills from it. The Court stated, however, that the prohibition was to prevent the material being used for radicalisation, rather than it posing a risk to the life of the defendants.

== Reactions ==
The legal proceedings relating to the Marines received widespread public and media attention in the UK.

Reacting to Blackman's guilty verdict, Royal Marines Brigadier Bill Dunham called the murder a "shocking and appalling aberration" that was "not consistent with the ethos, values and standards of the Royal Marines", but was nevertheless an "isolated incident". General Sir Mike Jackson said he was "saddened" by the case.

Blackman's guilty verdict led to a showing of public support for the Marine, with people creating social media groups and online petitions asking that he be given a lenient sentence or calling for his release. The Daily Telegraph supported one Change.org petition for leniency.

When Blackman was sentenced to life imprisonment with a tariff of 10 years, General Sir Nick Houghton called his actions a "heinous crime" and commented that "murder is murder". By contrast, Blackman's commanding officer, Lieutenant Colonel Simon Chapman of the 42 Commando, said in a letter read to the court that Blackman had had a "momentary ... lapse of judgment" and was "not a bad man", and added that Blackman had his "full support". Blackman himself said in a statement that he was "devastated" and "very sorry for any damage caused to the Royal Marines".

In November 2013, Colonel Oliver Lee OBE, commanding officer of the 45 Commando during Operation Herrick 14, resigned in protest at the narrowness of Blackman's court martial and his being prevented from giving evidence to it. Lee went on to give evidence at the Court Martial Appeal Court in 2017 where Blackman's conviction was reduced from murder to manslaughter.

On 28 October 2015, the Ministry of Defence banned a large number of serving soldiers from attending a rally in support of Sergeant Blackman, saying that the event was a "political protest". However, lawyers representing the rally organisers stated that, rather, the event was "a show of support to one of our fellow Royal Marines and not a 'political protest'". A related online petition to the government raised over 100,000 signatures calling for Blackman's immediate release, stating that the soldier had been condemned for defending his country. Within hours of the MoD's decision Michael Fallon, Minister for Defence, put out a government statement saying that the UK would maintain military operations in Afghanistan for the foreseeable future.

== See also ==
- Killing of Abdel Fattah al-Sharif
