= Governor MacMillan =

Governor MacMillan may refer to:

- Alison MacMillan, Acting Governor of Gibraltar for two periods between 2013 and 2015
- Gordon MacMillan (1897–1986), Governor and Commander-in-Chief of the City and Garrison of Gibraltar from 1952 to 1955
