= Danny Nightingale (British Army soldier) =

British soldier from Crewe (born 1975)

Danny Harold Nightingale (born 1975) is a British soldier from Crewe. He came to public attention in 2012 after he was court-martialled for illegal possession of a pistol and ammunition.

== Background ==
Nightingale enlisted in the British Army in 1995, and served in the Queen's Lancashire Regiment (later amalgamated into the Duke of Lancaster's Regiment). He served as a sergeant in the Special Air Service from 2001, undertaking tours of duty in Northern Ireland, Bosnia, Lebanon, Turkey, Iraq, Afghanistan, Syria and Libya. He helped develop the "Nightingale Dressing", a large occlusive dressing used in the management of penetrating chest trauma.

== Trial and campaign for release ==
In 2011, Nightingale was arrested when police found a Glock pistol and 338 rounds of ammunition in his house. Nightingale claimed that he could not remember being given the pistol and said that he had suffered memory loss following a serious illness. In November 2012, a court-martial sentenced him to 18 months' detention in the Military Corrective Training Centre. Philip Hammond, Secretary of State for Defence, asked Dominic Grieve, Attorney General, "to review whether the public interest test has been applied appropriately". Grieve declined to do so, saying the decision to prosecute and the appropriateness of the sentence were "a matter for the court martial appeal court, in due course." During a debate in the House of Commons several MPs called for Nightingale's release. A petition asking for the same gathered more than 100,000 signatures.

Nightingale and his supporters claimed that his trial had become "political" and that the authorities were pursuing a vendetta against him because he had challenged the military prosecutors.

On 29 November 2012, the Court Martial Appeal Court reduced and suspended the original sentence pending a further hearing. On 13 March 2013, the conviction resulting from Nightingale's guilty plea was quashed by the Court Martial Appeal Court and a retrial was ordered.

== Retrial ==
On 1 July 2013, Nightingale's retrial began at the Bulford military court. With legal costs potentially exceeding £100,000 a fundraising campaign was launched by campaign group Big Brother Watch. At trial, Nightingale said that his previous defence had been false and instead claimed the pistol and ammunition "must have belonged to his colleague and housemate," who was also an SAS soldier. Explaining why he had previously given a false version of events, William Clegg QC, for the defence, said that Nightingale had no memory of receiving the pistol and did not now believe it was his, and that his documented brain injury may have led to him "'confabulating', or piecing together plausible stories from what he hears or sees around him" to explain how it came to be in his bedroom. On 10 July Nightingale was found guilty and released on bail.

On 25 July 2013, he was sentenced to two years' detention, suspended for 12 months. Commodore His Honour Judge Jeffrey Blackett, the Judge Advocate General of the Armed Forces, and a Senior Circuit Judge said in his sentencing remarks: "We understand how difficult these proceedings have been for you and your family. However, you have brought much of that anguish upon yourself and your public assertions that you are a scapegoat or the victim of some wider political agenda is absolute nonsense." The judge also said that the case deserved a sentence of immediate custody, which would have been imposed save for the earlier remarks of the Court of Appeal. Nightingale's explanation of how the pistol and ammunition came to be in his bedroom was, said the judge, a "made up [and] spurious defence which falsely impugned the character of a fellow soldier and caused a number of SAS soldiers to risk their own security in giving evidence."

The judge also directed remarks toward "commentators and MPs" who had criticised the prosecution, stating: "I trust that those who have been so critical of the service prosecuting authority and the court martial process—particularly those who made unfounded and uninformed remarks under the cloak of parliamentary privilege—now realise how inappropriate and wrong their criticisms were."

Nightingale was banned by the SAS from making further comments to the media. His family said they had no regrets over pursuing the retrial and would "seek legal advice before considering an appeal."

In May 2014, Nightingale's application to appeal was rejected by the Court Martial Appeal Court. Lord Chief Justice Lord Thomas said there was a "considerable amount" of evidence to support the conviction and that proposed new evidence added "virtually nothing to the evidence before the court martial."
