= Arnold Reading =

English cricketer and Royal Marines officer

Major-General Arnold Reading CBE DL
- Born: 3 April 1896; Heilbron, Orange Free State
- Died: 4 January 1975 (aged 78); Sellicks Green, Somerset, England
- Military career
- Allegiance: United Kingdom
- Branch: Royal Marines
- Service years: 1914–1946
- Rank: Major-General
- Commands: 5th RM Battalion (1940–1942); 102nd RM Battalion (1942–1943); RM Training Group Devon (1944–1945); Plymouth Division RM (1945–1946)
- Conflicts: First World War; Second World War
- Awards: Order of the British Empire

Major-General Arnold Hughes Eagleton Reading CBE DL (3 April 1896 – 4 January 1975) was a Royal Marines officer and English first-class cricketer. He served in the Royal Marines from 1914–1946, rising to the rank of major-general, in addition to playing first-class cricket for the Royal Navy.

== Life and military career ==
The son of the Reverend Mark Alfred Reading, he was born in the Orange Free State in April 1896 at Heilbron. He was educated in England at Cranleigh School, before joining the Royal Marines at the start of the First World War as a probationary second lieutenant. During the war he was promoted twice, first to lieutenant in March 1915, while in May 1918 he was promoted to captain. Reading later made a single appearance in first-class cricket for the Royal Navy against the British Army cricket team at Lord's in 1929. Batting twice in the match, he was dismissed in the Royal Navy first-innings for 12 runs by Frederick Arnold, while in their second-innings he was dismissed for 7 runs by Edward Armitage. He was promoted to major in June 1932, before being promoted to lieutenant colonel.

At the start of the Second World War he was posted to HMS St. Angelo in Malta. In November 1939, he was made a temporary colonel, which he relinquished in January 1940. He was the commanding officer of 5th RM Battalion between March 1940 and February 1942, taking part in the operations in Dakar between August and October 1940. He was made an acting colonel commandant in February 1942, while in October 1943 he was made a colonel 2nd commandant.

He was appointed as the Royal Marines aide-de-camp to George VI in October 1945, by which time the war was over, replacing Arthur Reginald Chater in the role. After the conclusion of the war, Reading held the rank of temporary brigadier and was promoted to major-general in January 1946. He was made a CBE in the 1946 Birthday Honours. He was placed on the retired list in November of the same year, having ended his career as the commander of the RM Plymouth Division.

Following his retirement, Reading settled at Buckland St Mary, Somerset. He was appointed as a deputy lieutenant for Somerset in June 1955. He later moved to Sellicks Green, where he died in January 1975. He was survived by his wife, Phoebe, whom he had married in 1933.
