= James Rant =

British judge

His Honour Judge James Rant CB QC

Judge Advocate General
- In office 1 February 1991 – 25 May 2003
- Nominated by: The Lord Mackay of Clashfern
- Appointed by: Elizabeth II
- Preceded by: James Stuart-Smith
- Succeeded by: Jeff Blackett

James William Rant CB QC (16 April 1936 – 25 May 2003) was a British judge and the Judge Advocate General from 1991 until his death in 2003.

== Early life and education ==
Rant was born on 16 April 1936 in the Romford district of Essex and was educated at Stowe School and Selwyn College, Cambridge. He graduated from Selwyn College in 1958 and was called to the Bar by Gray's Inn in 1961.

== Career ==
Rant practised general law until 1970, when he began to specialise in criminal law. He became a QC in 1980 and by 1984 had become a circuit judge, sitting at the Old Bailey from 1986.

In 1991, he was appointed the Judge Advocate General, the first for a long time without a background or connection to the military. He made reforms to the court-martial system, including a centralised administration system for Army and Royal Air Force courts-martial and the introduction of judge advocates. He further reformed the system to reflect the introduction of the Human Rights Act including the creation of summary appeal courts.

Rant was appointed a Companion of the Order of the Bath in the 1995 Birthday Honours.

== Personal life ==
Rant married in 1963 and had two daughters and two sons. He died on 25 May 2003, aged 67.

Legal offices
Preceded by James Stuart-Smith	Judge Advocate General; 1991 - 2003	Succeeded by Jeff Blackett
