= Alan Massey =

Royal Navy Vice Admiral (born 1953)

Vice Admiral Sir Alan Massey KCB CBE
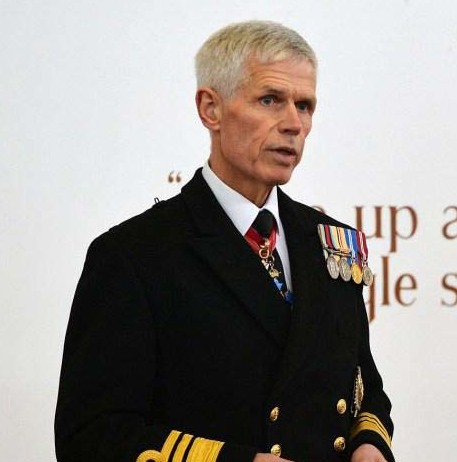
- Vice Admiral Massey in 2013
- Born: 9 March 1953 (age 73)
- Military career
- Allegiance: United Kingdom
- Branch: Royal Navy
- Rank: Vice admiral
- Commands: HMS Newcastle; HMS Campbeltown; HMS Illustrious; HMS Ark Royal; Naval Home Command
- Conflicts: Afghanistan War; Iraq War
- Awards: Knight Commander of the Order of the Bath; Commander of the Order of the British Empire

Vice Admiral Sir Alan Michael Massey, KCB, CBE (born 9 March 1953) is a former senior officer in the Royal Navy who served as the Second Sea Lord.

== Early life and education ==
Massey was educated at the University of Liverpool and Britannia Royal Naval College.

== Naval career ==
Massey trained as a seaman officer, specialising in above water warfare and as a fighter controller and navigator. His first posting was to HMS Bulwark in 1979. Massey's first command was HMS Newcastle in 1993, and he later saw service as captain of HMS Campbeltown, HMS Illustrious during operations against the Taliban regime in Afghanistan in 2001 and as captain of HMS Ark Royal when his ship led the amphibious assault into Iraq in 2003.

Staff tours included three appointments to the Ministry of Defence in London, serving in the NATO policy directorate, Defence Programmes and as assistant director of Navy Plans. He also served twice in NATO staff appointments: as military assistant to the chairman of the NATO Military Committee in Brussels (1991–1992) and head of plans for the Supreme Allied Commander Atlantic in Norfolk, Virginia (1999–2001). As a commodore, he led the Operations Division of the Permanent Joint Headquarters at Northwood and then went on to be Assistant Chief of the Naval Staff in July 2005, with the rank of rear admiral on 5 July 2005. He assumed office as Second Sea Lord in a ceremony aboard HMS Victory in July 2008.

== Later life ==
Having left the Navy, Massey was appointed chief executive of the Maritime and Coastguard Agency on 20 July 2010. During his time at the MCA, Massey was responsible for leading the MCA through a period of change, which included a reorganisation of HM Coastguard and the UK's search and rescue helicopter capability. Massey's other responsibilities at the MCA included leading the UK's efforts to improve safety at sea. Massey stepped down as chief executive on 31 October 2018.

Massey was appointed a non-executive director at Shoreham Port in January 2019.

== Honours ==
On 31 October 2003, Massey was appointed Commander of the Order of the British Empire (CBE) "in recognition of gallant and distinguished services whilst on operations in Iraq during the period 19th March to 19th April 2003". He was appointed Knight Commander of the Order of the Bath (KCB) in the 2009 Queen's Birthday Honours.

Military offices
Preceded by Adrian Johns	Assistant Chief of the Naval Staff; 2005–2008	Succeeded by Robert Cooling
Preceded by Sir Adrian Johns	Second Sea Lord; 2008–2010	Succeeded by Charles Montgomery
