= Jeff Blackett =

British judge and Royal Navy officer (born 1955)

Jeffrey Blackett OBE (born 20 May 1955) is a British former judge and Royal Navy officer with the rank of Commodore. He was Judge Advocate General of the Armed Forces from 2004 to 2020 and among the cases over which he presided was that of "Marine A". Blackett was criticised by the Criminal Cases Review Commission (CCRC) for sentencing Sgt Alexander Blackman RM to a life sentence for murder, as he failed to give the board the option to pass a lesser sentence of manslaughter. According to the report, the CCRC, which investigates miscarriages of justice, said Judge Blackett was guilty of a "material irregularity" in the original trial, due to an "apparent failure to recognise the position regarding manslaughter during the trial and to direct the board appropriately". Subsequently the Court Martial Appeal Court rejected any criticism of Blackett. They said: "We could see no basis for any criticism of the conduct of the Court Martial by the Judge Advocate General. He left the issues which had been raised by the prosecution and the defence during the hearing of the Court Martial to the Board in an entirely fair and proper manner." Alexander Blackman's murder conviction was eventually quashed in 2017 after a successful appeal.

In a previous high-profile case, Blackett also presided over the retrial in 2013 of SAS Sgt Danny Nightingale. Sgt Nightingale's first trial in 2012 resulted in a conviction for possession of an illegal weapon and a sentence of 18 months' detention in the Military Corrective Training Centre. After a public campaign and a debate in the House of Commons in which several MPs called for Nightingale's release, the conviction resulting from Nightingale's guilty plea was quashed by the Court Martial Appeal Court and a retrial was ordered. Blackett stated that he would like to impose an immediate custodial sentence. His hands were tied, however, by the previous ruling from the Court Martial Appeal Court that Sgt Nightingale should not be held in custody any longer.

He was the chief disciplinary officer at the Rugby Football Union (RFU) and conducted an investigation into the circumstances surrounding the Bloodgate scandal after ERC had completed its disciplinary processes. He also conducted an investigation into the sacking of John Steel as CEO by the Board in 2011 in which he recommended that the Board should all resign and seek re-election. He was President of the RFU from 2020 to 2022. He was a Senior Circuit Judge from 2005 until his retirement in 2020.

== Early life ==
Blackett was born on 20 May 1955. He went to Portsmouth Grammar School and read law at University College London. He joined the Royal Navy as a Midshipman (UCE) in September 1973. In 1983, he was called to the bar. He spent a year at St Antony's College Oxford in 1999/2000 and attained a Master of Studies.

== Career ==
=== Military career ===
Blackett was promoted to lieutenant on 1 September 1978 with seniority from 1 June 1978. He was promoted to lieutenant commander on 1 June 1986, and to commander on 30 June 1991. On 30 June 1998, he was promoted to captain. Having been an acting commodore, on 1 July 2003 he was promoted to commodore. His final appointment was as Director of Naval Legal Services.

He retired from the Royal Navy on 1 November 2004.

=== Judiciary career ===
Blackett was an Acting Metropolitan Stipendiary Magistrate from 1995 to 2000 and also sat as a uniformed judge advocate in Royal Navy courts-martial. On 2 February 2001, Blackett was appointed a Recorder, thereby becoming a part-time Circuit Judge. On 28 October 2004, he was promoted to full-time Circuit Judge. On 1 November 2004, he was appointed Judge Advocate General. He was the Court Martial Judge in the Sgt Blackman trial which was criticized by the Criminal Cases Review Commission. He was elected a Bencher of Gray's Inn in July 2008. In 2010, he became an honorary Professor of law at the University of Nottingham. He also sat as a Deputy High Court Judge in the Administrative Court from 2013 until his retirement from the bench. Blackett retired as a Circuit Judge and from the position of Judge Advocate General on 1 November 2020.

== Rugby union ==
Blackett has played and been an administrator in the sport of rugby union for much of his life. He played rugby at school, at the University of London and at Oxford University. He also played for the Royal Navy, Hampshire and the United Services Portsmouth Rugby Football Club. He played for the winning Royal Navy team in the 1981 Inter-Services Tournament, appearing against the Royal Air Force and in the Army Navy Match and also played in the Army-Navy match in March 1982. He represented the Royal Navy on the Rugby Football Union (RFU) Council from 2000 to 2004 and was RFU Disciplinary Officer from 2003 to 2013. He was a judicial officer in three Rugby World Cups (2003 - 2011) and officiated in many IRB and ERC hearings. He held other offices with the RFU from 2014 and 2018 (Chair of Governance, Chair of the Professional Game Board and non executive director on the Board of Directors). Blackett was appointed President of the RFU for the 2020-21 season in June 2020 and served for two years in that role because of Covid.

Legal offices
Preceded by James Rant	Judge Advocate General; 2004 - 2020	Succeeded by Alan Large
