= Garry Robison =

Retired Royal Marines officer

Major General Garry Robison CB
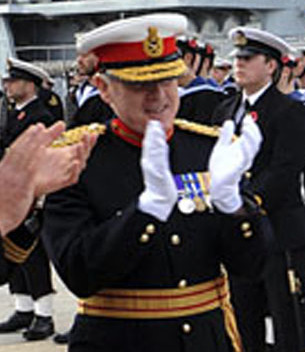
- Born: 10 June 1958 (age 68); Yorkshire, England
- Military career
- Allegiance: United Kingdom
- Branch: Royal Marines
- Service years: 1976–2011
- Rank: Major general
- Commands: Commandant General Royal Marines (2006–09); Commando Training Centre Royal Marines (2004–06); 45 Commando (1999–00)
- Conflicts: The Troubles; Iraq War; War in Afghanistan
- Awards: Companion of the Order of the Bath

Major General Garry Stuart Robison, CB (born 10 June 1958) is a retired Royal Marines officer who served as Commandant-General Royal Marines and Commander United Kingdom Amphibious Forces from 2006 to 2009.

== Early life ==
Robison was born in Yorkshire, the son of George Desmond Robison and Carole Margaret Robison (née Pugh). He was educated at Bemrose Grammar School.

== Military career ==
Robison joined the Royal Marines in September 1976 and underwent officer training. He served in 45 Commando, Comacchio Company, and on the staff of the Commando Training Centre Royal Marines. He qualified as a Physical Training and Sports Officer and taught in that capacity at Britannia Royal Naval College. In 1977 and 1978 he made two Emergency tours of duty in Northern Ireland during The Troubles.

From 1988 to 1989, Robison commanded Bravo Company in 40 Commando, before being selected to attend the Army Staff College, Camberley. After a number of staff appointments during the 1990s, Robison became the Royal Marine member on the Directing Staff at Camberley, and then at the Joint Services Command and Staff College upon its formation in 1997. In 1998–1999, he read for a master's in International Relations at Christ's College, Cambridge. He was then appointed Commanding Officer of 45 Commando in July 1999.

During his 18-month tenure of command, 45 Commando undertook environmental training in Belize and an operational tour as the Pristina Battlegroup under the UN Peacekeeping Operation in Kosovo. Following this Robison was appointed to staff positions in the Ministry of Defence before being assigned to Iraq for six months as Deputy Commander of the Iraq Survey Group in 2003. From 2004 to 2006 he was Commandant of the Commando Training Centre, before being promoted major general on 29 June 2006, and appointed Commandant-General Royal Marines, the commander of Britain's amphibious warfare capability. During this period he undertook a 12-month operational deployment to Afghanistan as the Deputy Commander (Stability) in the International Security Assistance Force based in Kabul.

Robison completed his appointment as Commandant-General in 2009; his final military appointment was as Chief of Staff (Capability) on the staff of Commander-in-Chief Fleet Headquarters. Robison was appointed Companion of the Order of the Bath (CB) in the 2010 Birthday Honours, and was awarded an Honorary Doctorate from the University of Derby in January 2011. Robison retired from the Royal Marines in June 2011 and joined Bechtel. He went on to be the security manager for Bechtel.

== Personal life ==
Robison married Bridget Anne (née Clark) in 1982, with whom he had one son and two daughters. He was Chairman of Combined Services Cricket, President of Royal Navy Cricket, Vice President of Royal Navy Football, President of Royal Marines Cricket, and President of Royal Marines Football. He remains an Honorary Vice President of Royal Navy Cricket and an Honorary Vice President of Royal Navy Football. He is a Freeman of the City of London and a Liveryman of the Worshipful Company of Plaisterers.

== Reference list ==
- Who's Who

Military offices
| Preceded by James Dutton | Commandant General Royal Marines; 2006–2009 | Succeeded by Andy Salmon |
