= Oliver Lee (Royal Marines officer) =

Former Royal Marines officer

Colonel Oliver Lee OBE
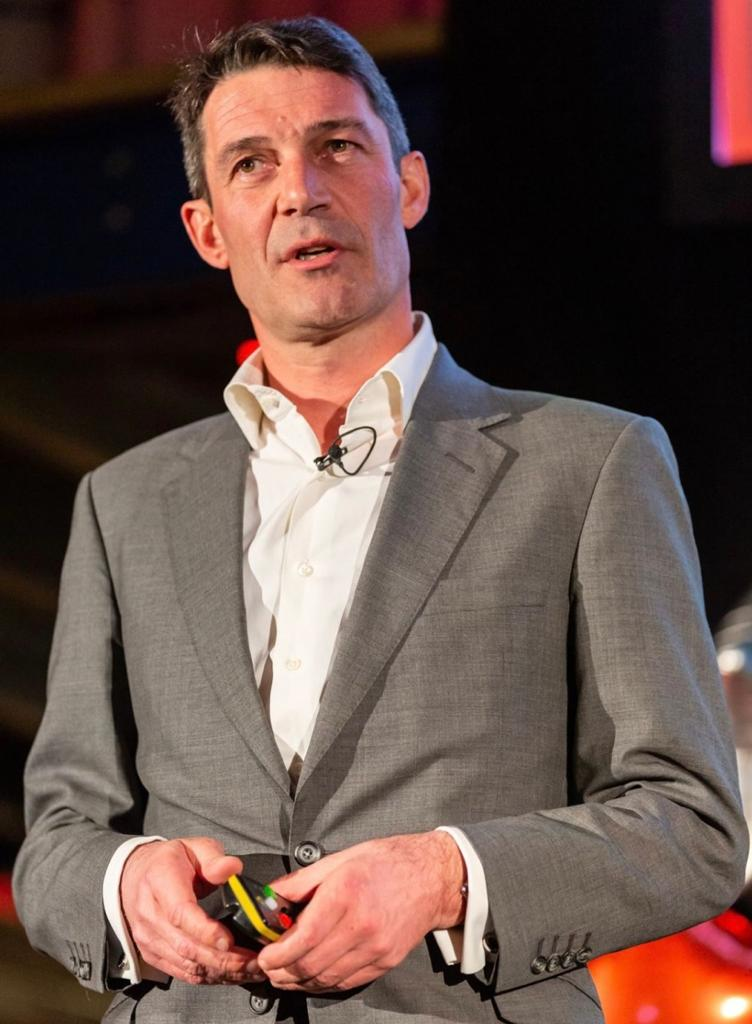
- Lee addressing staff at The Challenge in 2019
- Born: Birmingham, England
- Alma mater: Cambridge University
- Military career
- Allegiance: United Kingdom
- Branch: Royal Marines
- Service years: 1996–2014
- Rank: Colonel
- Commands: 45 Commando
- Conflicts: The Troubles; Bosnian War; Iraq War; War in Afghanistan
- Awards: Officer of the Order of the British Empire Member of the Order of the British Empire Queen's Commendation for Valuable Service

Colonel Oliver Andrew Lee, OBE is a former senior Royal Marines officer and subsequently chief executive, commentator and founder.

== Early life and education ==
The eldest child of six children, Lee was brought up in Birmingham. He was educated at King Edward's School, Birmingham, and Jesus College, Cambridge.

== Career ==
Lee undertook Royal Marines officer training in 1996, winning the sword of honour and commando medal. He subsequently served in Bosnia, Northern Ireland, Iraq and Afghanistan. He also worked in the private office staff of the Chief of the Defence Staff, Admiral of the Fleet Sir Michael Boyce, from 2000 to 2002, and defence minister Bob Ainsworth from 2007 to 2009. He commanded 45 Commando on Operation Herrick 14 in Afghanistan in 2011, during which he was promoted to full colonel, the youngest since the Second World War. Lee's chapter in the 2024 Bloomsbury book, Ground Truth, describes the difference in approach and performance of 45 Commando Group on Operation Herrick 14.

In 2013 Lee resigned from the Royal Marines on principle over the Sergeant Blackman (Marine A) Helmand Province Killing. Lee believed that Blackman had been inadequately led. He gave evidence at the Royal Courts of Justice in 2017, where Blackman's original conviction of murder was reduced to manslaughter on grounds of diminished responsibility.

Lee has since spoken strongly against any form of immorality on military operations, battlefield atrocities in particular. Concurrently, he has been a powerful advocate for Afghan people who supported the coalition forces in the country. In 2021, following the fall of Kabul to the Taleban, he was reunited after ten years with his interpreter who had fled to the United Kingdom from Afghanistan with his family.

Following his resignation in 2013, Lee retired from the Royal Marines in 2014. He then became the chief executive of The Challenge for five and a half years. The Challenge was a large, award-winning, social enterprise delivering residential courses, principally flowing from government contracts, for teenagers to improve their understanding of others and their preparedness for adult life. The organisation grew fast under Lee's tenure but entered administration in 2019 owing to a series of contractual disputes with the National Citizen Service Trust (NCS Trust). The Challenge launched a related bid in the high court into what its chairman described as a 'national scandal', but subsequently an alternative agreement was reached.

From 2022 until 2023 Lee worked for Places for People as the chief executive of one of its subsidiaries, Places Leisure, a 6,500 person, non-dividend company, dedicated to enabling health and fitness in more active communities.

In 2023, Lee delivered a tribute in Westminster Abbey at the Memorial Service for Admiral of the Fleet Lord Boyce.

In 2024, Lee was briefly the interim chief executive of the West Midlands Fire Service, a 1900 person organisation and the second largest in the country, dedicated to creating a safer, stronger and healthier community. There had been a number of alleged legacy scandals which resulted in Lee giving a news conference to address the issues and move the service forward.

In 2025, Lee founded Lunan Performance to help organisations perform exceptionally by inspiring everyone involved to be at their best.

== Honours ==
Lee was awarded the Queen's Commendation for Valuable Service in Iraq in 2003. He was appointed a Member of the Order of the British Empire in 2007, and then advanced to Officer of the Order of the British Empire. These two awards were for operational leadership and service in Afghanistan.

== Personal life ==
Lee's father, His Honour Judge Malcolm Lee QC, died of a heart attack in 1999 whilst serving as the Birmingham Mercantile Judge. His brother, Adrian, died of suicide in 2003.

Lee is married with two children.
