= Adrian Johns =

Royal Navy Vice Admiral (born 1951)

Vice Admiral Sir Adrian Johns KCB CBE KStJ DL
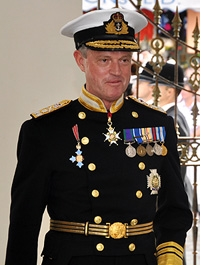
- Johns at his swearing-in ceremony as Governor of Gibraltar, 26 October 2009.

Governor of Gibraltar
- In office 26 October 2009 – 13 November 2013
- Monarch: Elizabeth II
- Chief Minister: Peter Caruana; Fabian Picardo
- Preceded by: Sir Robert Fulton
- Succeeded by: Sir James Dutton

Personal details
- Born: 1 September 1951 (age 75) Redruth, Cornwall, England
- Education: Imperial College London

Military service
- Allegiance: United Kingdom
- Branch/service: Royal Navy
- Years of service: 1973–2013
- Rank: Vice Admiral
- Commands: Naval Home Command; HMS Ocean; HMS Campbeltown; HMS Ariadne; HMS Juno; HMS Yarnton
- Battles/wars: Iraq War
- Awards: Knight Commander of the Order of the Bath; Commander of the Order of the British Empire; Queen's Commendation for Valuable Service; Knight of Justice of the Order of St John

Viceregal styles of Sir Adrian Johns (2009–2013)
- Reference style: His Excellency
- Spoken style: Your Excellency

Vice Admiral Sir Adrian James Johns, KCB, CBE, KStJ, DL (born 1 September 1951) is a former senior officer in the Royal Navy, serving as Second Sea Lord between 2005 and 2008. He was the Governor of Gibraltar between 2009 and 2013.

== Early life and education ==
Johns was born on 1 September 1951. He was educated at Newquay Grammar School in Cornwall and then Imperial College London, where he studied physics.

== Naval career ==
Johns joined the Royal Navy in 1973. On 1 September 1975, he was promoted to lieutenant, with seniority from 1 January 1975. After his initial postings, Johns trained as a helicopter pilot and then served as a Westland Sea King pilot with 824 Naval Air Squadron aboard HMS Ark Royal. He became a flying instructor in 1979. In 1981, he was given his first command on board HMS Yarnton in Hong Kong and was promoted to lieutenant commander on 16 October 1982. After holding other naval posts, he was promoted to commander on 30 June 1988 and then commanded the frigates HMS Juno and HMS Ariadne between 1988 and 1990.

Johns attained the rank of captain on 31 December 1994. Between various appointments at the Ministry of Defence, he held the command of the frigate HMS Campbeltown from 1995 to 1996.

Johns was appointed Commander of the Order of the British Empire (CBE) in the 2001 New Year Honours. Later that year, he took command of the amphibious assault ship HMS Ocean. It was deployed to Iraq in spring 2003. Following this tour, Johns received a Queen's Commendation for Valuable Service, gazetted on 31 October 2003. He relinquished command of the Ocean on his promotion to rear admiral in May 2003.

Johns became Assistant Chief of the Naval Staff in May 2003. In October 2005, he was promoted to vice admiral and appointed Second Sea Lord and Commander in Chief of Naval Home Command. The 2008 New Year Honours saw him appointed Knight Commander of the Order of the Bath (KCB). He was succeeded as Second Sea Lord by Vice-Admiral Alan Massey in July 2008.

On 9 June 2009, the Foreign and Commonwealth Office announced that Johns would succeed Sir Robert Fulton as Governor of Gibraltar later that year. Johns arrived at Gibraltar on board HMS Lancaster and was sworn into the office of Governor of Gibraltar on Monday 26 October 2009. He is a patron of the armed forces career management charity Soldier On!

On 2 February 2011, Johns was appointed a Knight of the Order of St. John, an honour in the personal gift of Her Majesty The Queen.

Military offices
Preceded by Timothy McClement	Assistant Chief of the Naval Staff; 2003–2005	Succeeded by Alan Massey
Preceded by Sir James Burnell-Nugent	Second Sea Lord; 2005–2008	Succeeded by Sir Alan Massey
Government offices
Preceded by Sir Robert Fulton	Governor of Gibraltar; 2009–2013	Succeeded by Sir James Dutton
