= James Dutton (Royal Marines officer) =

Royal Marines officer and former Governor of Gibraltar (born 1954)

Lieutenant General Sir James Dutton KCB CBE
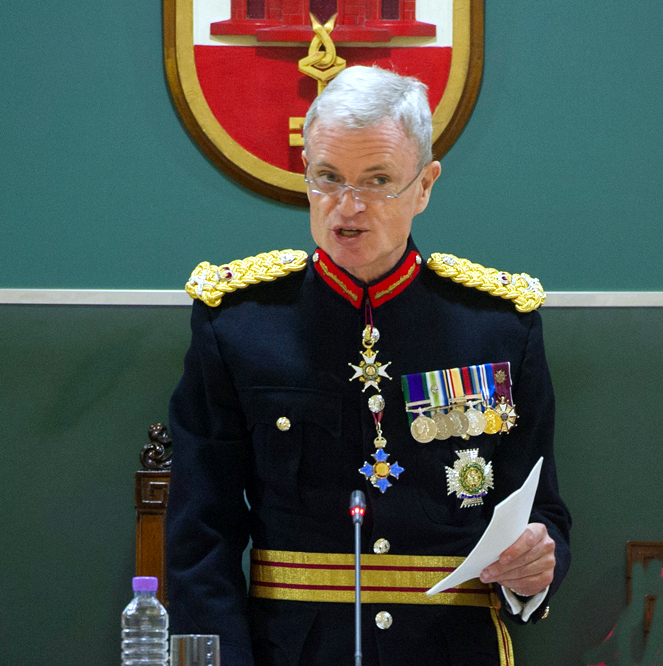
- Dutton being sworn in as Governor in 2013

Governor of Gibraltar
- In office 6 December 2013 – 28 September 2015
- Monarch: Elizabeth II
- Chief Minister: Fabian Picardo
- Preceded by: Sir Adrian Johns
- Succeeded by: Ed Davis

Personal details
- Born: 21 February 1954 (age 72)
- Spouse(s): Elizabeth, Lady Dutton
- Children: 2

Military service
- Allegiance: United Kingdom
- Branch/service: Royal Marines
- Years of service: 1972–2010
- Rank: Lieutenant General
- Commands: Deputy Commander, ISAF; Multi-National Division (South-East) (Iraq); Commandant General Royal Marines/Commander UK Amphibious Forces; 3 Commando Brigade; 40 Commando
- Battles/wars: Falklands War; War in Afghanistan; Iraq War
- Awards: Knight Commander of the Order of the Bath; Commander of the Order of the British Empire; Knight of the Order of St John; Officer of the Legion of Merit (United States)

Viceregal styles of Sir James Dutton (2013–2015)
- Reference style: His Excellency
- Spoken style: Your Excellency

Lieutenant General Sir James Benjamin "Jim" Dutton, KCB, CBE (born 21 February 1954) is a retired Royal Marines officer and former Governor of Gibraltar. He held various staff positions in his early career, before commanding 40 Commando. As a brigadier, he held two high-level staff posts—the first at the Ministry of Defence in London, as Director of NATO policy, and the second as a British liaison to The Pentagon shortly after the September 11 attacks, where he was involved in the planning for the subsequent invasion of Afghanistan.

After the planning for the invasion, Dutton took command of 3 Commando Brigade, which was already serving in Afghanistan. In 2003, he led the brigade into the start of Iraq War, supported by units from the British Army as well as the United States Marine Corps, making Dutton the first British officer to command American troops since the Second World War. He commanded his men through heavy resistance from Iraqi forces in the early days of the war.

As a general officer, he served as Commandant General Royal Marines, the professional head of the Royal Marines and a dual-hatted appointment with Commander UK Amphibious Forces, for two years. While in this post, Dutton returned to Iraq to command Multi-national Division (South-East) in 2005, where he attracted media attention through outspoken remarks alleging Iranian support for the insurgents in Iraq. His last field post, as a lieutenant general, was as Deputy Commander of the International Security Assistance Force in Afghanistan. He held the position from 2008 to 2009, during the peak of the Taliban insurgency, and assisted American General Stanley A. McChrystal, then commander of ISAF, in redesigning the military strategy to combat the insurgency. Dutton retired from the military in 2010. He was later appointed Governor of Gibraltar, taking up office on 6 December 2013; he retired early from the post, in September 2015.

== Early and personal life ==
Dutton was born on 21 February 1954, to Edgar and Aileen Dutton. He was educated at The King's School, Chester, then an all-boys private school. He studied systems and management at City University London, where he gained a Bachelor of Science (BSc) degree.

He is married to Elizabeth (née Waddell). The couple have one son, who is also an officer in the Royal Marines, and one daughter. Dutton lists his interests as sailing and running.

== Early military career ==
Dutton originally applied to join the British Army but failed the selection process. He applied to join, and was commissioned into, the Royal Marines in 1972. He was promoted to acting lieutenant in 1975, before being granted the substantive rank in 1976, with seniority from October 1975. He served as a signals officer in the Falklands War and, after holding a variety of staff positions in the junior ranks, was promoted to major in 1990. In 1996 he assumed command of 40 Commando, in which position he served on manoeuvres in Asia and South Africa.

As a brigadier, Dutton served at the Ministry of Defence as Director, NATO policy, a senior staff post, prior to attending the Royal College of Defence Studies. He was pulled off the course before completion and seconded to The Pentagon in Washington, DC to act as liaison between the British Chief of the Defence Staff and the American Chairman of the Joint Chiefs of Staff in the immediate aftermath of the terrorist attacks on the United States.

While seconded to The Pentagon, Dutton was involved in the joint American and British planning for the subsequent "war on terror". The Times called this assignment the moment Dutton's career "took off". "Keen" to command the Royal Marines in action in Afghanistan, Dutton took command of 3 Commando Brigade in 2002 and deployed to Afghanistan in command of 1700 personnel, succeeding Roger Lane. The replacement was controversial and led to speculation that it was politically motivated by Lane's criticism of the Ministry of Defence and public contradiction of Geoff Hoon, then Secretary of State for Defence, over the readiness of troops.

The brigade had a tour of duty in Iraq in early 2003, at the very beginning of the Iraq War. Dutton led 3 Commando, as well as supporting units from the Royal Engineers, 7 Armoured Division, 16 Air Assault Brigade along with troops from multiple other nations, including US Marines, the first time American troops had been under the operational command of a British officer since the Second World War. Royal Marines from 40 Commando under Dutton's overall command, along with United States Navy SEALs, secured oil fields on the Al-Faw Peninsula to prevent them from being burned in the first days of the ground operation, after which 40 Commando and others from 3 Commando Brigade moved up the peninsula and took the port city of Umm Qasr, where they encountered resistance into the fifth day of the ground campaign.

Dutton also commanded the brigade through heavy fighting on the outskirts of Basra and commented that the fighting had been more intense there than predicted, saying "the planning assumption had always been that the advancing coalition forces would simply sweep past Basra and it would implode by itself". Dutton's calmness during the invasion prompted journalist Tim Butcher, who reported on the war while attached to 3 Commando Brigade, to describe him as "a lean, thinking man with none of the tub-thumping machismo of some officers" and "coldly professional in his job".

While still under Dutton's command in late 2003, 3 Commando Brigade conducted the Royal Marines' first visit to Slovenia, prior to the country's accession to the European Union and NATO, for alpine warfare training led by Slovenian troops and culminating in the five-day Exercise Royal Chamois. With the brigade, Dutton also undertook cold-weather training in Norway in 2004. He was appointed Commander of the Order of the British Empire (CBE) in October 2003.

In 2002, Dutton was given the honorary appointment of Aide-de-camp to the Queen.

== High command ==
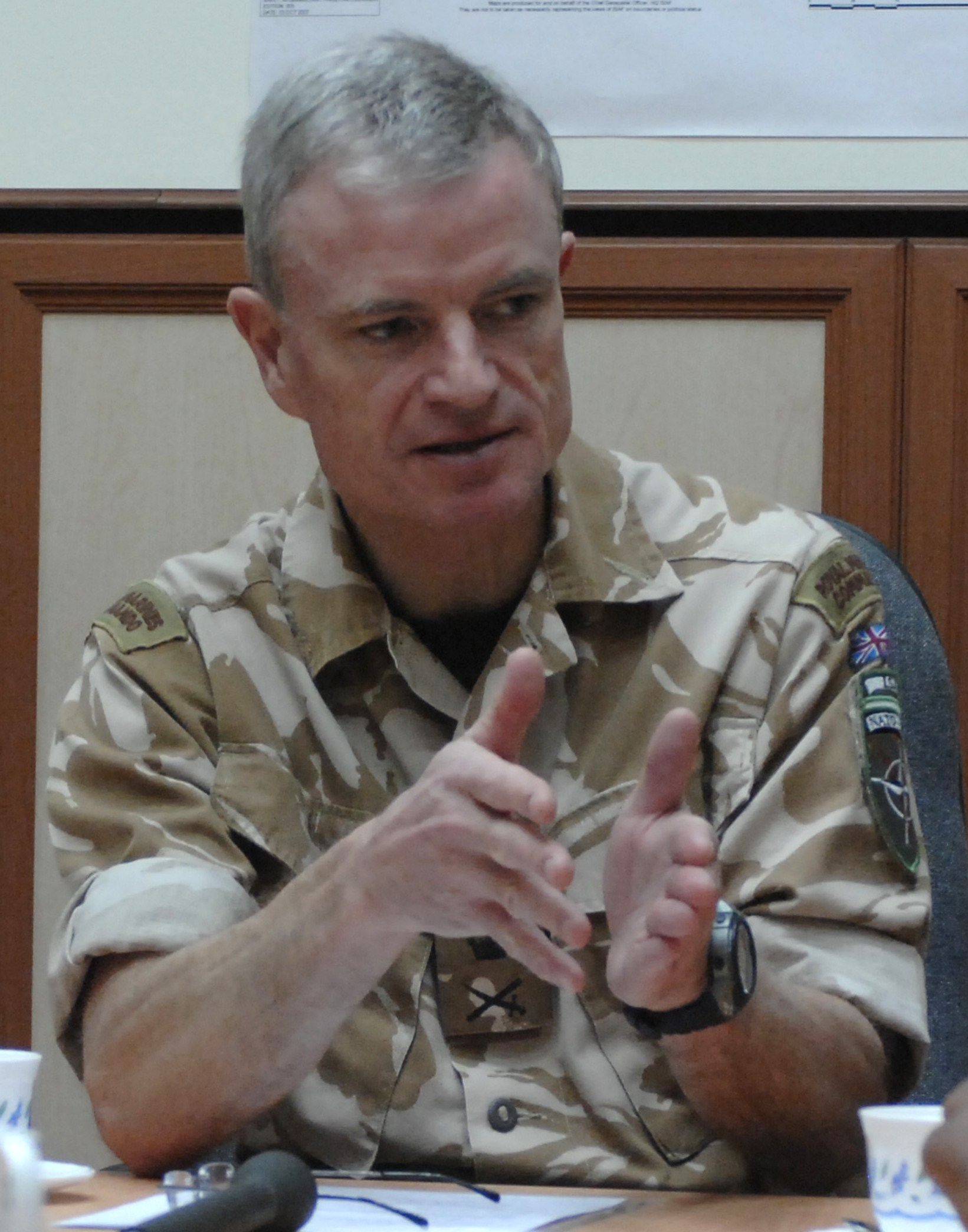
Dutton during a briefing in Afghanistan in February 2009

Dutton attained general officer status with promotion to major general on 4 May 2004, and was appointed to the double-hatted post of Commandant General Royal Marines (CGRM) and Commander UK Amphibious Forces (COMUKAMPHIBFOR). He relinquished CGRM/COMUKAMPHIBFOR in June 2006, succeeded by Major General Garry Robison, taking a staff post as Chief of Staff (Capability), before appointment to Chief of Staff (Operations). He was appointed Honorary Colonel of 131 Independent Commando Squadron Royal Engineers in March 2006, succeeding Lieutenant General Sir Robert Fry.

In 2005, he deployed to Basra, Iraq, taking command of Multi-national Division (South-East). While there, he was outspoken on the subject of improvised explosive devices, responsible for many coalition casualties, and accusing neighbouring Iran of aiding, or failing to prevent, the smuggling of munitions across the border into Iraq. Dutton added "I simply don't know whether this is Iranian government policy or whether this is simply groups who are using Iran for their own purposes and not being controlled".

Having been promoted to lieutenant general in November 2008, Dutton succeeded Army Lieutenant General Jonathon Riley as Deputy Commander of the International Security Assistance Force (ISAF) in Afghanistan, a position he occupied until November 2009. During his tenure, the insurgency in Afghanistan peaked. Dutton helped American General Stanley A. McChrystal, then overall commander of troops in the country, formulate a new strategy to combat the insurgency, which included an increase in the number of troops. Dutton was succeeded in his post at ISAF by Lieutenant General (later General Sir) Nick Parker at the end of 2009.

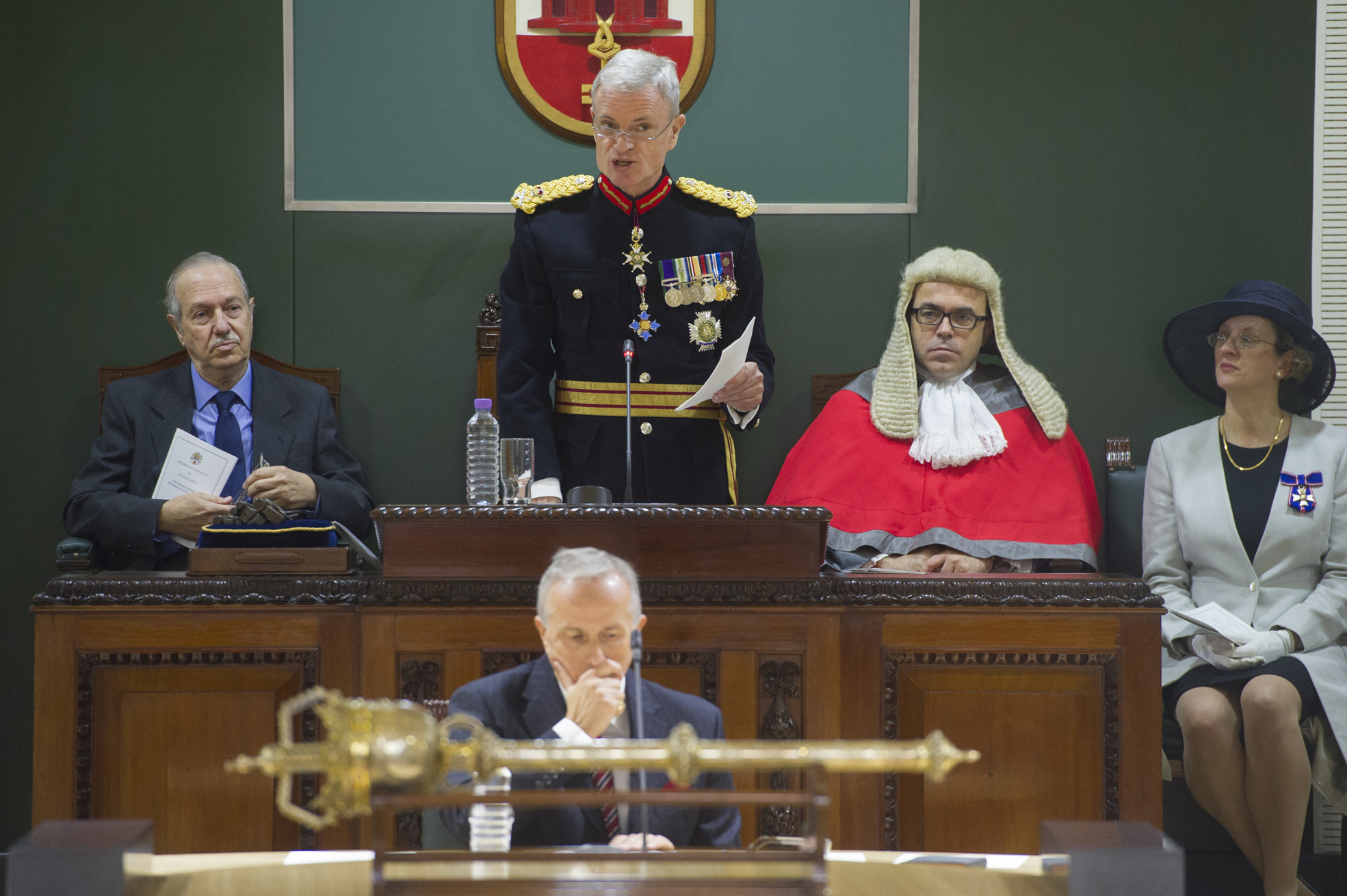
Dutton being sworn in as Governor of Gibraltar at the Gibraltar Parliament

Upon his return from Afghanistan, Dutton wrote an article for The Guardian newspaper, in which he opined that the NATO-led forces in the country were making a difference and the situation was improving, but that the Afghan government still required assistance. He argued that more troops did not necessarily mean more violence, saying that "experience shows that after an initial spike as the insurgents are cleared out, violence reduces to much lower levels" and that "providing a sense of security depends on much more than physical troop presence, but it has to start with that. We need sufficient troops to protect the people and convince them that Afghan government control (supported by [ISAF] for the moment) is sufficient to prevent the return of the insurgents. He went on to say that "the backbone of the NATO alliance gives the coalition a steadfastness which "coalitions of the willing" cannot match. It also gives unparalleled authority and legitimacy based on the consensus of its members". Dutton concluded that "given the strength of this unparalleled military coalition, and the political and financial commitment to building the long-term stability of Afghanistan and the region, failure should not be contemplated". He was awarded the American Legion of Merit (Degree of Officer), and given permission to wear the decoration, "in recognition of meritorious, gallant and distinguished services during coalition operations in Afghanistan".

Dutton retired from active service on 3 May 2010. He was appointed Knight Commander of the Order of the Bath (KCB) in the 2010 Queen's Birthday Honours.

== Civilian career ==
After retiring from the Royal Marines in 2010, Dutton joined Bechtel Corporation as an operations manager, dealing with issues in the Middle East, and went on to become the company's programme director for Gabon in 2011. After three years with Bechtel, he was appointed governor of the British Overseas Territory of Gibraltar, and took office on 6 December 2013.

On 26 May 2015 it was announced that Dutton would relinquish the post early. Dutton resigned effectively on 28 September 2015, concluding his civilian career working with the British Foreign Office. Dutton cited that his resignation was due to his frustration over the British Government's lack of action towards the Spanish aggression in Gibraltar's sovereign waters, his disenchantment with the largely ceremonial office of Governor (later denied) and his personal inability to act on these events.

With Dutton's leaving of office, his Deputy Governor, Alison MacMillan, was sworn in as interim Governor of Gibraltar on the same day as his official departure. MacMillan had already served as interim Governor, doing so when Sir Adrian Johns resigned in 2013. It was announced on 1 October 2015 by the Foreign Office that Lieutenant General Ed Davis would be succeeding Dutton as Governor of Gibraltar effective 2016.

On 5 August 2016, Dutton was appointed a Knight of the Order of St John by Queen Elizabeth II.

Military offices
Preceded by David Wilson	Commandant General Royal Marines; 2004–2006	Succeeded by Garry Robison
Preceded by Jonathon Riley	General Officer Commanding; Multi-National Division (South East), Iraq; 2005	Succeeded by John Cooper
Preceded by Jonathon Riley	Deputy Commander, ISAF; 2008–2009	Succeeded by Sir Nick Parker
Government offices
Preceded by Sir Adrian Johns	Governor of Gibraltar; 2013–2015	Succeeded by Ed Davis
