= 45 Commando =

Battalion sized formation of the Royal Marines

Coordinates: 56°34.821′N 2°37.745′W

45 Commando Royal Marines
- Unit badge
- Active: 1943–Present
- Country: United Kingdom
- Branch: Royal Marines; Naval Service
- Type: Commando
- Size: Battalion
- Part of: UK Commando Force
- Garrison/HQ: RM Condor, Arbroath
- Mottos: Latin: Per Mare Per Terram (By Sea By Land)
- March: Quick – A Life on the Ocean Wave; Slow – Preobrajensky
- Website: 45 Commando - Royal Navy

Commanders
- Current commander: Lt Col Edward Hall MBE, RM

45 Commando Royal Marines (pronounced "four-five commando") is a battalion sized unit of the British Royal Marines and subordinate unit within UK Commando Force, the principal Commando formation, under the Operational Command of the Fleet Commander.

Tasked as a Commando amphibious unit, 45 Cdo RM is capable of a wide range of operational tasks. Based at RM Condor, their barracks in Arbroath, personnel regularly deploy outside the United Kingdom on operations or training.

All personnel have completed the Commando course at the Commando Training Centre at Lympstone in Devon, entitling them to wear the green beret, with attached personnel having completed the All Arms Commando Course.

== History ==
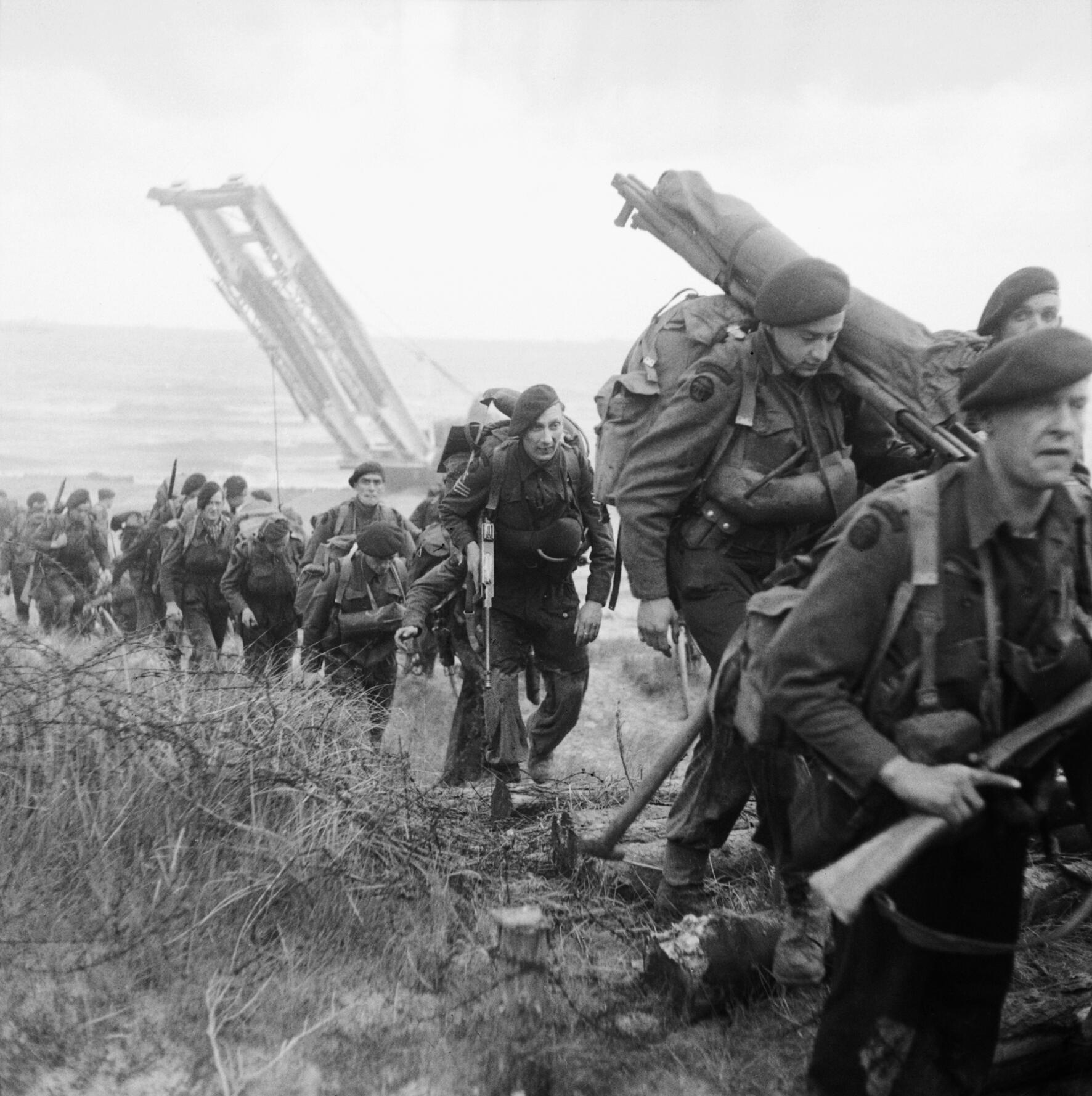
Royal Marine Commandos attached to 3rd Division move inland from Sword Beach on the Normandy coast, 6 June 1944.

=== 5th RM Battalion ===
The 5th RM Battalion was originally raised for a brief period at the end of World War I (September 1918-February 1919), and was again raised on 2 April 1940 following mass mobilisation and the influx of "hostilities only" (HO) marines. The battalion was raised at Cowshot Camp in Brookwood (now part of the Pirbright Camp complex), being incorporated into 101 RM Bde, along with the 1st RM Battalion. Between August and October 1940 the battalion took part in operations in Dakar. On return until August 1943 the battalion conducted extensive training in Wales, Scotland, the Isle of Wight and Burley, where the battalion reformed as 45 RM Commando on 1 August 1943. It was commanded between March 1940 and February 1942 by Arnold Reading.

=== 45 RM Commando ===
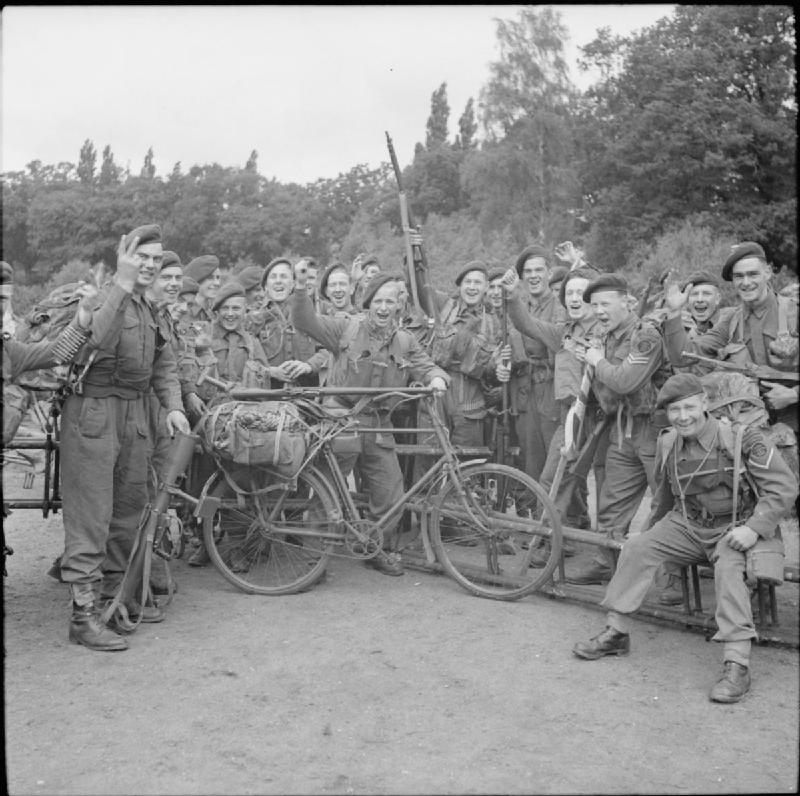
Men of 45 (RM) Commando, 1st Special Service Brigade, in high spirits as they prepare to embark for the invasion, 3 June 1944.

After reforming and retitling, the unit transitioned to the Commando role as a formed unit, by-passing the individual volunteer and selection process undertaken by Army Commando candidates. Personnel undertook, and completed, the Commando Basic Training Course at Achnacarry, Scotland. As part of the 1st Special Service Brigade, the Commando participated in Operation Overlord (the D-Day Normandy landings), before going on to move through Europe into Germany, including Brachterbeek on 23 January 1945. During the Ardennes Offensive, the retitled 1st Commando Brigade was given the task of holding a stretch of the River Meuse; it was during this period of operations that Lance Corporal H. Harden, a medical orderly of the RAMC attached to 45 (RM) Commando, won the Victoria Cross.

=== Post-World War II reorganisation ===
Following the Second World War both 1st Commando Brigade (Nos 3, 4 and 6 Army Commandos and 45 RM Commando) and 2nd Commando Brigade (Nos 2 and 9 Army Cdos and 40 and 43 RM Cdos) disbanded, leaving 3 Cdo Bde (then comprising 1 and 5 Army Cdos and 42 and 44 RM Cdos) in place in the Far East. 3 Cdo Bde reorganised, disbanding 1 and 5 Army Cdos, and took on 45 RM Cdo, which joined the Bde in Hong Kong, from the UK, in January 1946. In order to preserve the heritage of a 2 Cdo Bde unit, as well as that of 1 Cdo Bde (45 RM Cdo), 44 Commando was retitled 40 Commando (which had been disbanded in UK in October 1945) and took on 40 RM Cdo's colours, battle honours and traditions, albeit with 44 RM Cdo's manpower. The three remaining commandos were restyled 40, 42 and 45 Commandos RM in March 1946.

=== 1940s/1950s ===
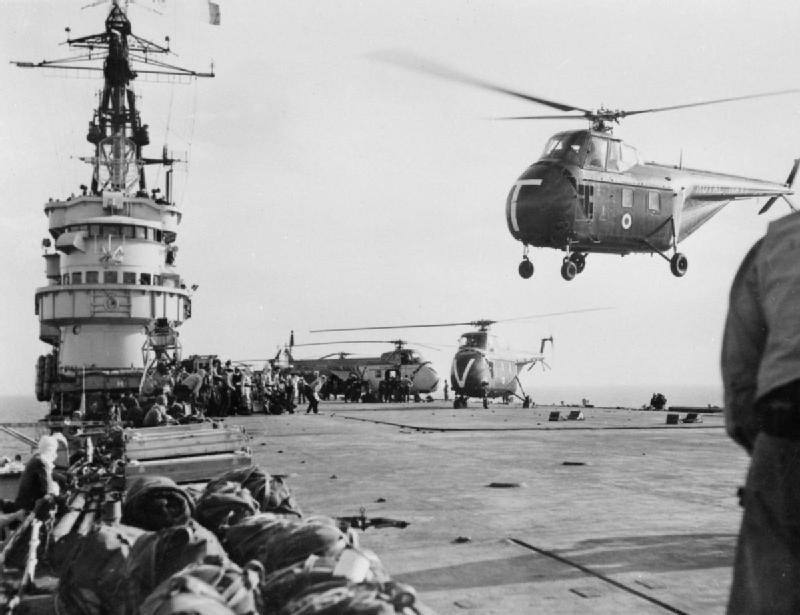
Royal Navy Westland Whirlwind helicopters taking the first men of 45 Royal Marine Commando into action at Port Said from HMS Theseus.

The Commando unit was based in Hong Kong between January 1946 and May 1947, conducting internal security duties, as part of 3 Cdo Bde RM. Between May 1947 and December 1948 the Commando moved to Malta, during which time it deployed to Libya, Palestine, Suez and Jordan. The Commando unit returned to Hong Kong in December 1948 and from there deployed to Malaya between 1950 and 1952 taking part in operations during the Emergency. Between 1952 and 1959 the Commando was once again based in Malta. In September 1955 45 Commando was deployed to Cyprus to undertake anti-terrorist operations against the EOKA guerrillas who were fighting against British control of the island. EOKA were a small, but powerful organisation of Greek Cypriots, who had great local support from the Greek community. The unit traveled to the Kyrenia mountain area of the island and in December 1955 launched Operation Foxhunter, a failed operation to destroy EOKA's main base.

Then in 1956 the unit deployed to Egypt as part of the response to the Suez Crisis, conducting the first helicopter assault in history.

=== 1960s ===
Between 1960 and 1967 the Commando was based in Aden, from where it conducted 10 operational tours in the Radfan during the Aden Emergency. The Commando unit also deployed briefly to Kuwait following an Iraqi threat to her Independence in 1961. In January 1964, part of then Tanganyika, later to become the Tanzanian Army mutinied. 45 Commando who were in Aden boarded HMS Centaur and sailed to East Africa and anchored off-shore from Dar es Salaam. The revolt was put down after 45 Commando landed by helicopter at Colito Barracks with other operations around the country over the coming days.

The last elements of the 45 Commando left Aden on 29 November 1967 to return to the UK for the first time since the end of World War II. They set up home in Stonehouse Barracks, Plymouth.

=== 1970s/1980s ===
In 1970 the Commando began Arctic training for the first time, taking on the role of Britain's mountain and Arctic warfare experts (joined later by the other Commandos). 45 Cdo RM deployed to Norway for the first of many winters in 1971, which coincided with a move of the unit from Stonehouse, Plymouth to the old Naval Air Station, RNAS Arbroath (now RM Condor) in Arbroath, Scotland, where the unit still remains. This period in the unit's history is characterised by the alternation of Northern Ireland tours and winters in Norway, protecting NATO's northern flank.

==== Falklands War ====
Following the Argentine invasion of 2 April 1982, 45 Cdo RM, under the command of Lieutenant Colonel Andrew F. Whitehead RM, had their Easter leave cancelled and hastily deployed to the Falklands, travelling in a mix of Royal Navy (RN) and Royal Fleet Auxiliary (RFA) ships. Having made a tactical landing at Red Beach, Ajax Bay on 21 May 1982, the men of 45 Cdo RM yomped across East Falkland, via Port San Carlos, New House, Douglas Settlement, Teal Inlet and Mount Kent to take part in the Battle for Port Stanley. They conducted a night attack on the Two Sisters feature over the 11/12 June 1982, during which the Commando unit lost 8 men killed and 17 wounded. The Argentinians surrendered on 14 June 1982. Lt. Col Whitehead was awarded the Distinguished Service Order (DSO).

=== 1990s ===
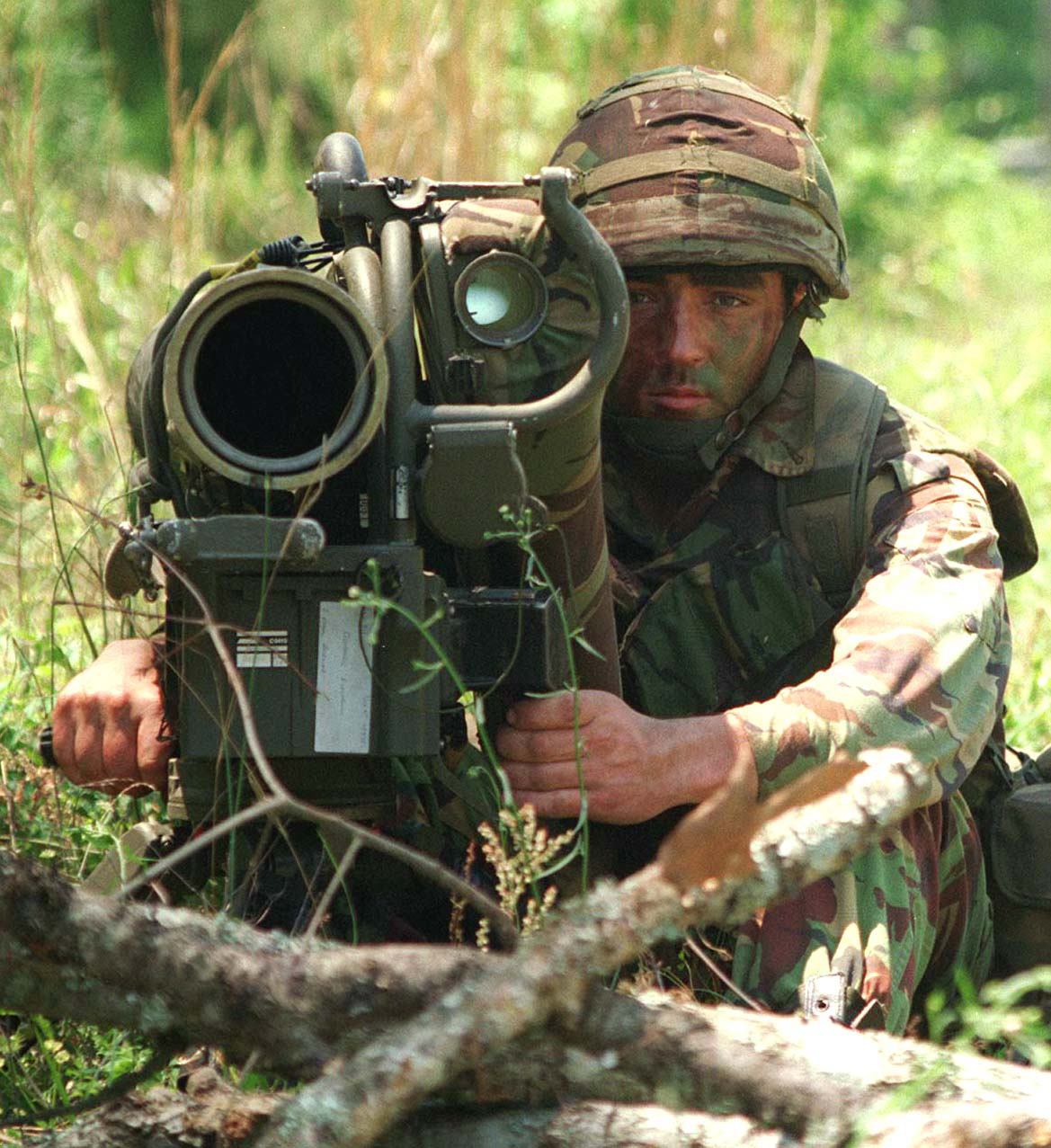
A British Royal Marine from 45 Commando watches for enemy tanks and armoured personnel carriers from behind his anti-armour weapon as part of Combined Joint Task Force Exercise '96.

The Commando unit deployed to Northern Iraq on Operation Haven at the end of the Gulf War, where it spent 2 months in the Zakho area, withdrawing at the end of June. In 1993 The Commando unit was deployed to Belize for the last operational jungle tour in that country. In a mirror image of its 1961 deployment to Kuwait, the Commando returned on Operation Driver in 1994, in support of Kuwait, following some threatening troop movements by the Iraqis on their side of the border. In 1998 the Commando unit was redirected from an exercise in Belize, to assist Nicaragua and Honduras following the devastation caused by Hurricane Mitch.

=== 2000s ===
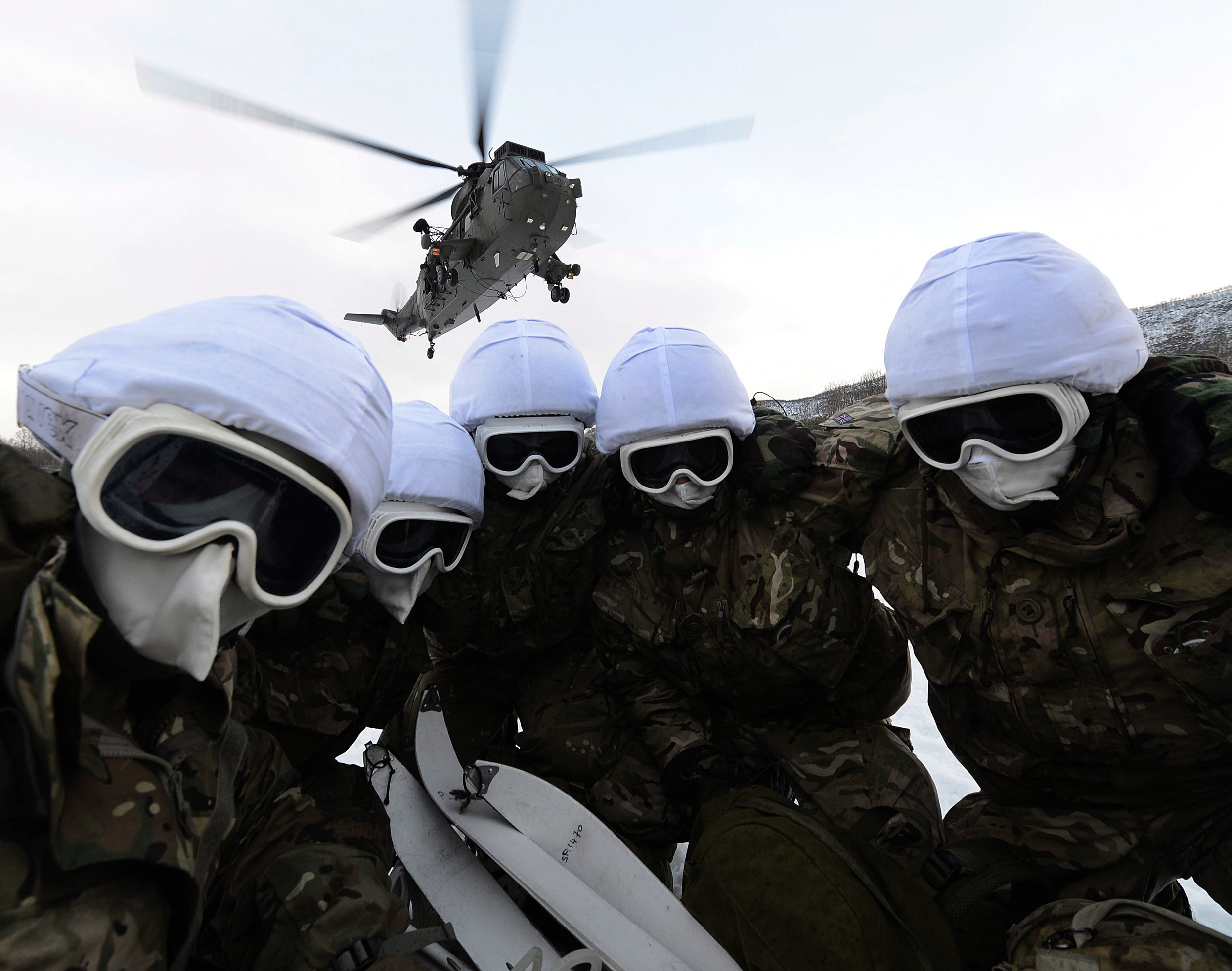
Ground crew with the Commando Helicopter Force huddle from the downwash of a Sea King helicopter on exercise in Norway.

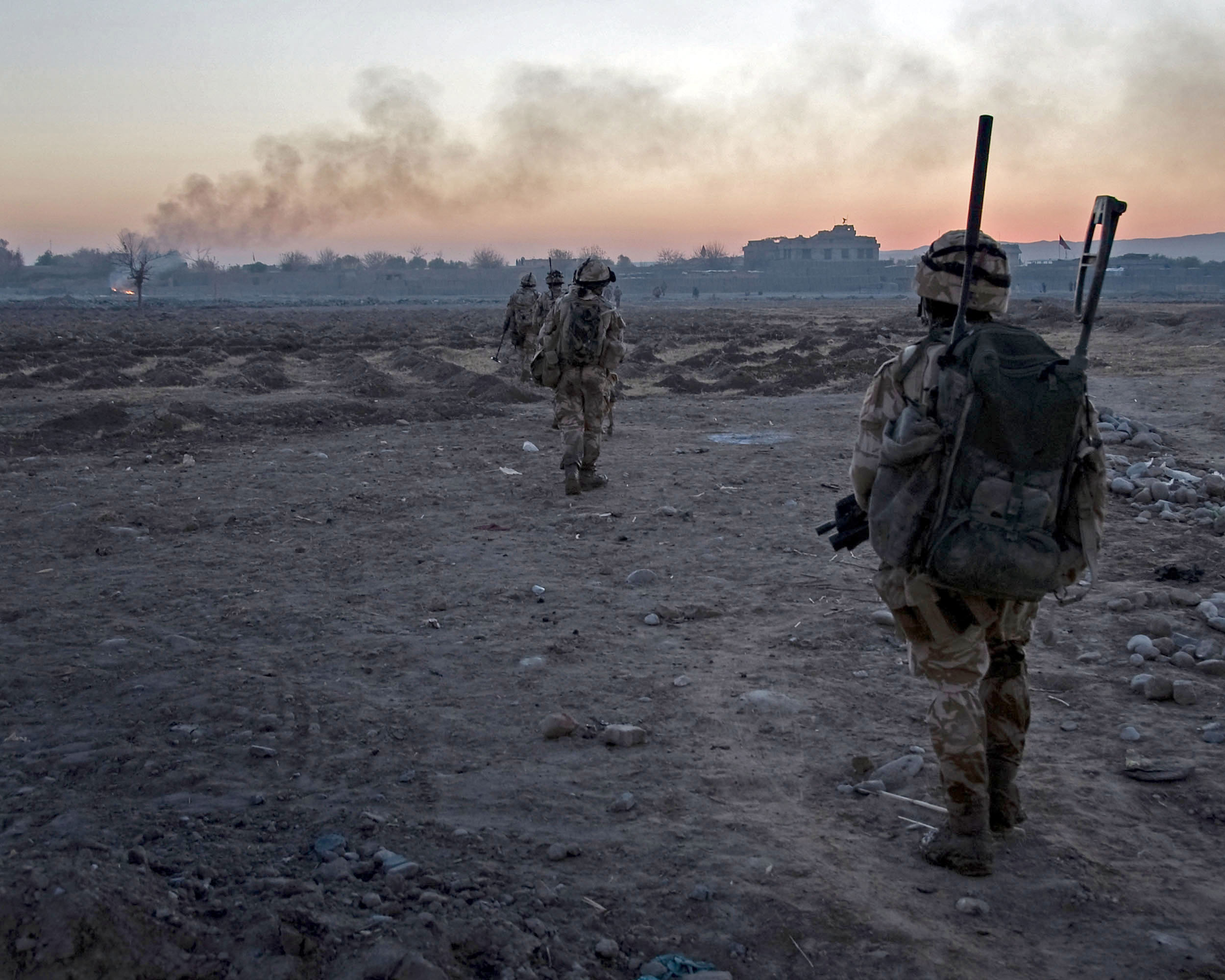
Members of Whisky Company, 45 Commando Royal Marines patrolling across barren landscape from FOB (Forward Operating Base) Jackson at Sangin in Helmand Province in Afghanistan.

At the turn of the Millennium, the Commando unit was deployed to Kosovo under KFOR as part of 3 Cdo Bde RM on Operation Agricola IV. From April 2002, the unit deployed to Afghanistan on Operation Jacana, and also took part in Operation Telic 1, the 2003 invasion of Iraq. X-Ray Company Group was attached to the Special Boat Service (SBS), Whisky Company Group attached to the Special Air Service (SAS).

In September 2003, 45 Commando was granted the Freedom of Angus in recognition of their service in Iraq and Afghanistan and contribution to the local economy of Arbroath, where they are based.

In January 2004 the unit deployed to Northern Ireland (Operation Banner) for 6 months in support of peacekeeping operations, returning home in June. On return, it became the Spearhead Lead Commando, a role assumed on a rotational basis. The Lead Commando is at a high level of readiness, able to deploy at short notice on operations worldwide.

In September 2004, whilst still Lead Commando unit, the Group deployed to the United States on Exercise BLACKHORSE. This was split into two phases, the first of which took place with the United States Marines Corps Ground-Air Combat Centre at 29 Palms, California. This 900 square miles of desert, allowed realistic live firing, involving artillery and air strikes. The second phase took place at the Marine Corps Mountain Warfare Training Centre, high in the Sierra Nevada Mountains. An early snowfall meant the Commando was able to carry out cold weather warfare training, operating between 7000 and 11,000 feet (3,400 m). 2006 saw the Unit deploy to Norway for further Arctic training which culminated with a NATO led exercise.

The focus switched to preparation for deploying to Afghanistan on Operation HERRICK 5 in late 2006. This deployment saw the Commando take on a number of different roles, the principal one being that of the Operational Mentoring and Liaison Team (OMLT). The OMLT task was to work alongside the Afghan National Army and develop it into a self-sufficient organisation. The Unit returned from Afghanistan in April 2007.

October 2008 saw the Commando unit return to Afghanistan as Northern Battle Group in Helmand Province on Operation HERRICK 9. The operational area of responsibility was the Upper Sangin Valley which extended for 80 km along the length of the Helmand River. The Battle Group was in excess of 1200 strong, half of whom came from 45 Commando.

April/May 2009 saw the return of the Commando to Arbroath in Scotland for reorganisation ahead of a winter deployment to Norway to practice cold weather and amphibious tactics.

=== 2010s ===
45 Commando deployed to Afghanistan again, as part of 3 Commando Brigade, for 6 months in March 2011 on Operation Herrick 14. They returned home in October 2011.

45 Commando was the lead commando group for the UK until May 2013, able to deploy at short notice. In October 2013 Whisky Company from 45 Commando exercised in Ghana with US, Dutch and Spanish Marines.

45 Commando Royal Marines provided the guard of honour during the Beating Retreat Ceremony of the Royal Marines Band Service to celebrate the birthday of their Captain General Prince Philip, Duke of Edinburgh at Horse Guards Parade in May 2016.

It became clear in 2018 that 45 Commando would, as would 40 Commando, form the infantry component of a Littoral Response Group, as part of restructuring in the Future Commando Force programme.

=== 2020s ===
In 2022, 350 marines from 45 Commando supported diplomats from the British embassy in Ukraine, and a small number may have provided weapons and training to Ukrainian troops.

== Structure ==
The structure is as follows:

- Command Company, RM Condor
- Logistics Company
- Whisky Company (W Coy)
- X-Ray Company (X Coy)
- Yankee Company (Y Coy)
- Zulu Company (Z Coy)

== Commanding officers ==
Commanders have included:

=== As 5 RM Bn ===
- 1940–1942 Lt Col H E Reading RM
- 1942–1942 Lt Col S G Cutler RM (February – September)
- 1942–1943 Lt Col K Hunt RM

=== As 45 RM Commando ===
- 1943–1944 Lt Col N C Ries RM
- 1944–1945 Lt Col W N Gray DSO RM
- 1945–1945 Lt Col A L Blake MC RM (March – April)
- 1945–1945 Lt Col W N Gray DSO RM (April – July)
- 1945–1945 Lt Col I D De'ath DSO MBE RM (July – December)
- 1945–1946 Lt Col R D Houghton MC RM

=== As 45 Commando RM ===
- 1946–1948 Lt Col T M Gray DSO MC RM
- 1948–1948 Lt Col E C E Palmer DSO RM (January – July)
- 1948–1948 Lt Col P L Norcock RM (July – November)
- 1948–1950 Lt Col N C Ries OBE RM
- 1950–1952 Lt Col R C de M Leathes MVO OBE RM
- 1952–1954 Lt Col F A Eustace OBE RM
- 1954–1956 Lt Col N H Tailyour DSO RM
- 1956–1956 Lt Col R D Crombie RM (November – December)
- 1956–1957 Lt Col N H Tailour DSO RM
- 1957-1958 Lt Col J Richards OBE RM
- 1958–1958 Lt Col R D Crombie RM (July – September)
- 1958–1960 Lt Col F C Barton RM
- 1960–1962 Lt Col L G Marsh MC RM
- 1962–1963 Lt Col N S E Maude RM
- 1963–1964 Lt Col T M P Stevens MC RM
- 1964–1966 Lt Col R J McGarel Groves RM
- 1966–1967 Lt Col F C E Bye RM
- 1967–1968 Lt Col J I H Owen OBE RM
- 1968–1969 Lt Col J C C Richards RM
- 1969–1971 Lt Col R J Ephraums OBE RM
- 1971–1974 Lt Col Sir Steuart Pringle Bt RM
- 1974–1976 Lt Col L E Hudson RM
- 1976–1978 Lt Col J St J Grey RM
- 1978–1981 Lt Col B H B Learoyd RM
- 1981–1983 Lt Col A F Whitehead DSO RM
- 1983–1985 Lt Col I M H Moore RM
- 1985–1987 Lt Col A M Keeling RM
- 1987–1989 Lt Col S J Pack RM
- 1989–1991 Lt Col J J Thompson OBE RM
- 1991-1993 Lt Col D V Nicolls RM
- 1993-1995 Lt Col D Wilson OBE RM
- 1995–1997 Lt Col R A Fry MBE RM
- 1997–1999 Lt Col J H Thomas RM
- 1999–2001 Lt Col G S Robison RM
- 2001–2003 Lt Col S T Chicken OBE RM
- 2003–2004 Lt Col T J Bevis RM
- 2004–2006 Lt Col N P Lindley RM
- 2006–2007 Lt Col D A Dewar RM
- 2007–2009 Lt Col J A J Morris DSO RM
- 2009–2012 Lt Col O A Lee MBE RM
- 2012–2013 Lt Col M J Tanner RM
- 2013–2015 Lt Col D J Cheesman MBE RM
- 2015–2017 Lt Col A R Turner RM
- 2017–2019 Lt Col D G Forbes RM
- 2019–2021 Lt Col I Catton RM
- 2021–Present Lt Col E Hall MBE RM

== Battle honours ==
The following Battle honours were awarded to the British Commandos during the Second World War.

- Adriatic
- Alethangyaw
- Aller
- Anzio
- Argenta Gap
- Burma 1943–45
- Crete
- Dieppe
- Dives Crossing
- Djebel Choucha
- Flushing
- Greece 1944–45
- Italy 1943–45
- Kangaw
- Landing at Porto San Venere
- Landing in Sicily
- Leese
- Litani
- Madagascar
- Middle East 1941, 1942, 1944
- Monte Ornito
- Myebon
- Normandy Landing
- North Africa 1941–43
- North-West Europe 1942, 1944–1945
- Norway 1941
- Pursuit to Messina
- Rhine
- St. Nazaire
- Salerno
- Sedjenane 1
- Sicily 1943
- Steamroller Farm
- Syria 1941
- Termoli
- Vaagso
- Valli di Comacchio
- Westkapelle
