= Alison MacMillan =

British diplomat

Alison Flora MacMillan LVO DL
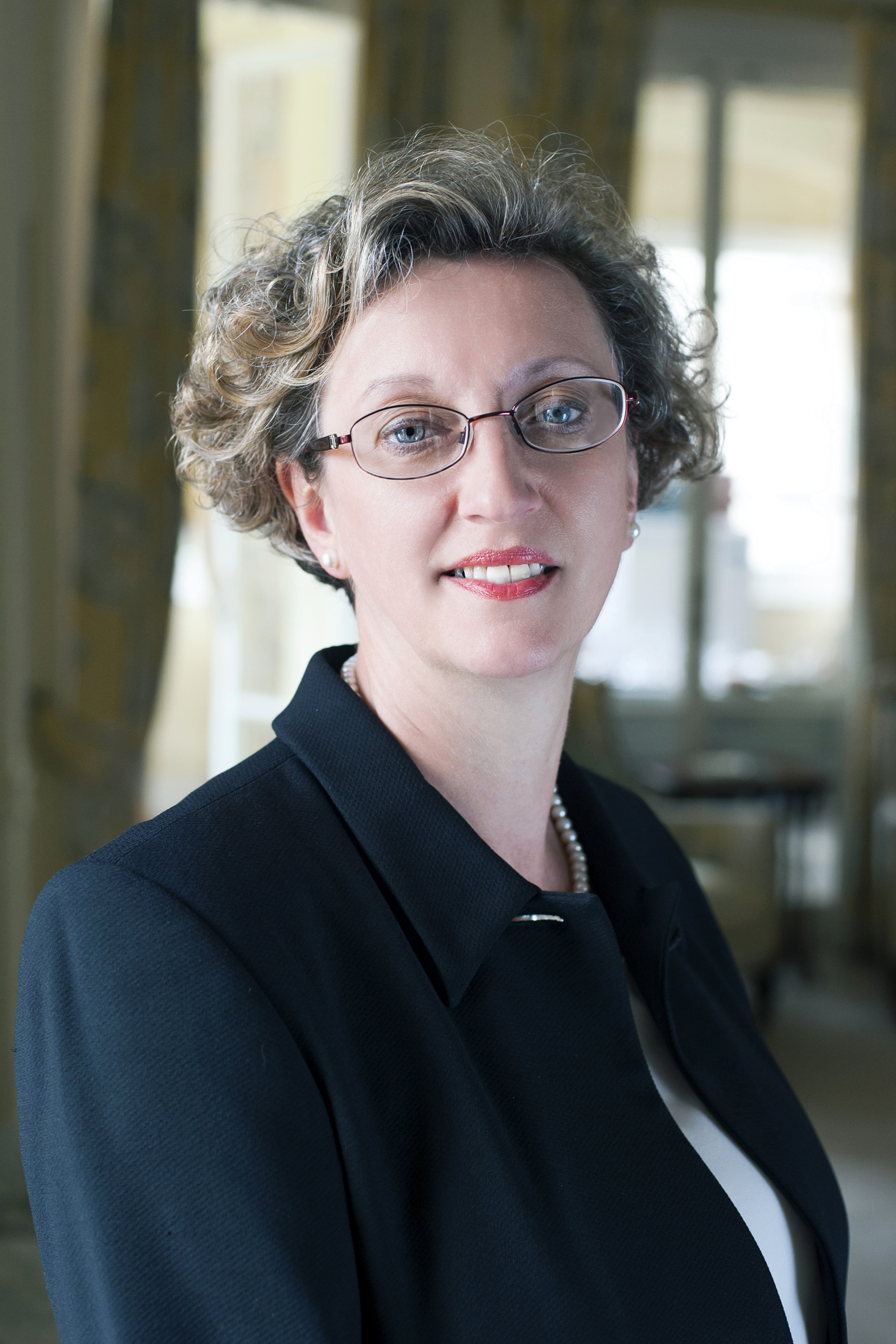

Governor of Gibraltar Acting
- In office 28 September 2015 – 19 January 2016
- Monarch: Elizabeth II
- Chief Minister: Fabian Picardo
- Preceded by: Sir James Dutton
- Succeeded by: Ed Davis
- In office 13 November 2013 – 6 December 2013
- Monarch: Elizabeth II
- Preceded by: Sir Adrian Johns
- Succeeded by: Sir James Dutton

Deputy Governor of Gibraltar
- In office May 2013 – September 2016
- Succeeded by: Nick Pyle

Personal details
- Born: Devon, United Kingdom
- Spouse: Julian
- Children: 2
- Profession: Diplomat

Alison Flora MacMillan LVO,DL, is a British diplomat, who served as Deputy Governor of Gibraltar from 2013 to 2016. For two periods during 2013 and 2015, MacMillan served as governor in an acting capacity.

== Career ==
MacMillan joined the Foreign and Commonwealth Office in February 1982, having previously worked as a translator in Paris. She served in British diplomatic missions in Mexico, the US, Chile and Nicaragua. MacMillan was made a member of the Royal Victorian Order in the 2013 New Year Honours when she was deputy director of protocol and assistant marshal of the Diplomatic Corps.

Following the departure of Vice Admiral Sir Adrian Johns in 2013, MacMillan was sworn in to assume the full powers of the governor. She once more served as interim governor from September 2015 when Johns' successor Lieutenant General Sir James Dutton also left having resigned.
