= Henry MacGeagh =

British judge

Colonel Sir Henry Davies Foster MacGeagh GCVO KCB KBE TD QC (21 October 1883 – 29 December 1962) was a British judge, who served as Judge Advocate General of the Armed Forces. He was admitted to the Middle Temple on 13 January 1903 and was Called to the Bar on 27 June 1906. He was later Called to the Bench on 29 January 1931.

== Arms ==
Coat of arms of Henry MacGeagh

Notes
Displayed on a stall plate at the King's Chapel of the Savoy.
Motto
Praesto Semper Servire
