= Spearhead Land Element =

Principal high-readiness component of the British Armed Forces

The Spearhead Lead Element (SLE), sometimes referred to as the Spearhead Land Element, is one of two high-readiness components of the British Armed Forces under the operational control of the Permanent Joint Headquarters, with the other being the Spearhead Naval Element (SNE). It is typically a battle group formed around a light infantry battalion, or Commando, with force elements from other arms allocated.

The SLE is oriented towards low and medium-intensity operations such as regional security, disaster-relief or non-combatant evacuation.

== Deployment ==
Initial force elements required to deploy from the base location within 24 hours are the Headquarters company, high-readiness company and associated logistic enablers. The remaining force will be required to deploy within 48 hours.

The SLE is nominated for a six-month period to avoid burnout and for maintenance of capability.

== Maintaining readiness ==
Maintaining the highest readiness levels required of a Spearhead battalion is not easy. Equipment and supplies can be kept up to the necessary establishment relatively simply but the readiness of the soldiers, individually and collectively, inevitably declines unless active measures are taken to maintain it. The value of collective training diminishes over time, individual skills fade rapidly if not practised continually and administrative matters, such as passports, vaccinations and next of kin documentation, require constant refreshment (including keeping up with the constant inflow and outflow of personnel). A number of measures are taken to mitigate this potential ‘readinessfade’, as battalions are unlikely to participate in a high-value overseas training exercise more often than once every 2 – 21/2 years. Sub-unit exercises are run throughout the period of the Spearhead commitment, a Combined Arms Staff Trainer exercise is conducted to train and test the battalion headquarters staff and weekly company training programmes are scrutinised by the battalion headquarters to ensure meaningful, focussed training is undertaken on a regular basis. Finally, the Lead Company role is rotated between companies every month. This enables the battalion headquarters to ‘call-out’ the Lead Company, thus regularly auditing the companies’ (and the battalion headquarters’) abilities to deploy in the required timelines and with the correct equipment and documentation.

== Partial list of nominated SLE battalions ==
- 2009 1st Battalion, The Royal Irish Regiment
- 2009 1st Battalion, The Royal Anglian Regiment
- 2008 3rd Battalion, The Rifles
- 2006 2nd Battalion, The Light Infantry
- 2005 1st Battalion Royal Gloucestershire, Berkshire and Wiltshire Regiment
- 2003 42 Commando, Royal Marines
- 2003 1st Battalion, Royal Green Jackets

== Spearhead in popular culture ==
- Spearhead - British television drama series 1978-1981
