= Frederick Arnold (cricketer) =

English cricketer and British Army officer (1899–1980)

Personal information
- Full name: Frederick George Arnold
- Born: 18 November 1899; Dover, Kent, England
- Died: 16 December 1980 (aged 81); Broughton, Hampshire, England
- Batting: Right-handed
- Bowling: Right-arm fast-medium

Domestic team information
- Years: Team
- 1935/36: Europeans

Career statistics
| Competition | First-class |
|---|---|
| Matches | 6 |
| Runs scored | 33 |
| Batting average | 16.50 |
| 100s/50s | –/– |
| Top score | 15 |
| Balls bowled | 1,341 |
| Wickets | 18 |
| Bowling average | 27.38 |
| 5 wickets in innings | 1 |
| 10 wickets in match | – |
| Best bowling | 6/41 |
| Catches/stumpings | 2/– |
- Source: ESPNcricinfo, 26 May 2019

Frederick George Arnold OBE (18 November 1899 – 16 December 1980) was an English first-class cricketer and British Army officer. Arnold served in the Royal Army Dental Corps from 1925–1955, during which time he also played first-class cricket in England for the British Army cricket team, as well as for the Europeans in British India.

== Life and military career ==
Arnold was born at Dover and studied to become a dental surgeon at the University of London. After graduating he joined the Royal Army Dental Corps in April 1925 as a second lieutenant. He made his debut in first-class cricket for the British Army cricket team against Oxford University at Oxford in 1926. He played four further first-class matches for the Army in 1928, 1929 and 1930, appearing twice each against the Royal Air Force and the Royal Navy. He was promoted to the rank of captain in October 1928, with promotion to the rank of major following in October 1935.

While serving in British India, Arnold played one first-class match for the Europeans against the Hindus at Bombay in the 1935-36 Bombay Quadrangular. Playing as a right-arm fast-medium bowler, he took 18 wickets across six first-class matches, with best figures of 6 for 41 and a bowling average of 27.38. His best figures, which were also his only five wicket haul in first-class cricket, came against the Royal Navy in 1928. He was made an OBE in the 1946 New Year Honours, with promotion to the rank of lieutenant colonel coming in December 1947. He was promoted to the rank of colonel in August 1951, before retiring from active service in August 1955. He died at Broughton in Hampshire in December 1980.
