= James Stuart-Smith =

British judge and British Army officer

James Stuart-Smith CB QC
- Born: 13 September 1919; Brighton, Sussex, England
- Died: 15 May 2013 (aged 93)
- Occupations: British judge and British Army officer

James Stuart-Smith, CB, QC (13 September 1919 – 15 May 2013) was a British judge and British Army officer. He served as Judge Advocate General from 1984 to 1991.

== Early life ==
Stuart-Smith was born on 13 September 1919 in Brighton, Sussex, England. From 1933 to 1938, he was educated at Brighton College, an independent school in Brighton. He went on to study medicine at the London Hospital; he had only completed one year of his study before the breakout of the Second World War.

== Career ==
=== Military service ===
On 14 January 1940, Stuart-Smith was commissioned into the King's Royal Rifle Corps, British Army, with the rank of second lieutenant. He was given the service number 113640. In 1946, he was promoted to lieutenant colonel. During World War II, he saw active service in Italy, Egypt and Palestine. He was demobilised in 1947.

=== Law career ===
Following the end of his military service, Stuart-Smith began his career in law. He was called to the bar at Middle Temple in 1948. He practised as a barrister from 1948 to 1955. During this part of his career, he defended one of the Kray twins. He successfully convinced the jury to find him not guilty as it could not be proved beyond reasonable doubt which of the identical twins did the crime.

In 1955, Stuart-Smith joined the office of the Judge Advocate General as a legal assistant. He was appointed Deputy Judge Advocate in 1957. From 1964 to 1965, during the Aden Emergency, he served in Aden as the Senior Judge Advocate. Having returned to the UK, he was promoted to Assistant Judge Advocate General in 1968. He was once more posted abroad from 1976 to 1979 as the Senior Judge Advocate with the British Forces in Germany. In 1981, he was promoted to Vice Judge Advocate General, the second most senior Judge Advocate General. He was promoted to Judge Advocate General of the Armed Forces on 24 August 1984. On 16 April 1985, he was appointed a Recorder. He retired in 1991, having served as a military judge for 36 years and holding every appointment from the lowest to the highest.

In addition to his career as a military judge, Stuart-Smith was involved with the International Society for Military Law and the Law of War, serving as its vice-president from 1979 to 1985 and its president from 1985 to 1991. He was then made its honorary president, a title he held from 1991 until his death.

== Personal life ==
In 1957, Stuart-Smith married Jean Groundsell. Together they had two children; a son and a daughter. His wife predeceased him.

Stuart-Smith died on 15 May 2013.

== Honours ==
Stuart-Smith was appointed Companion of the Order of the Bath (CB) in the 1986 Birthday Honours. He was appointed a Queen's Counsel (QC) in 1988.
