= HMS Campbeltown (F86) =

1989 Type 22 or Broadsword class frigate of the Royal Navy

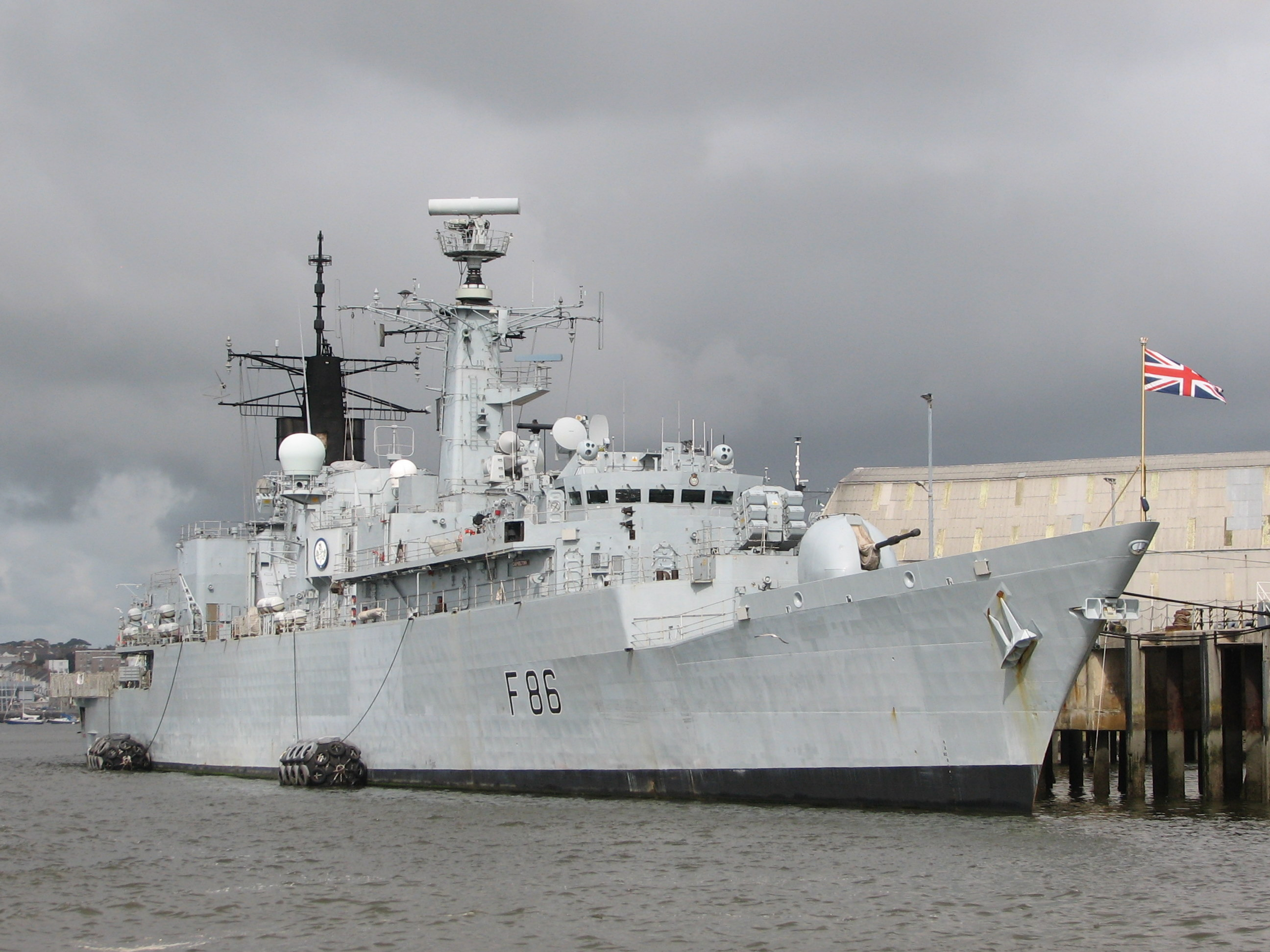
- HMS Campbeltown at HMNB Devonport in September 2008

History

United Kingdom
- Name: HMS Campbeltown
- Operator: Royal Navy
- Ordered: January 1985
- Builder: Cammell Laird
- Laid down: 4 December 1985
- Launched: 7 October 1987
- Commissioned: 27 May 1989
- Decommissioned: 7 April 2011
- Home port: HMNB Devonport, Plymouth
- Identification: Pennant number: F86; Deck code: CT; IMO number: 4907139; International callsign: GABK
- Motto: Victoria Fortes Sequitur; "Victory Through Strength"
- Fate: Scrapped October 2013
- Badge

General characteristics
- Class & type: Type 22 frigate
- Displacement: 5,300 tons
- Length: 148.1 m (485 ft 11 in)
- Beam: 14.8 m (48 ft 7 in)
- Draught: 6.4 m (21 ft 0 in)
- Propulsion: 2 × Rolls-Royce Spey gas turbines (high speed); 2 × Rolls-Royce Tyne gas turbines (cruising)
- Speed: 18 knots (33 km/h; 21 mph) (cruise); 30 knots (56 km/h; 35 mph) (max)
- Complement: 250 (max. 301)
- Armament: 2 × Sea Wolf anti air system (Total of 72 Sea Wolf missiles); 2 × quad Harpoon missile launchers (total of 8 Harpoons); 2 × triple Magazine launched anti-submarine torpedo tubes (total of 36 torpedoes); 1 × 4.5 inch (114 mm) Mk.8 gun; 2 × 20 mm GAM-BO1 guns; 1 × Goalkeeper CIWS; NATO Seagnat decoy launchers; 1 x Late Entry Guardsman
- Aircraft carried: 2 x Lynx Mk.8 helicopters (but only 1 Lynx in peacetime).; Armed with; 4 × Sea Skua anti-ships missiles; 2 × Sting Ray anti-submarine torpedoes; 2 × Mk 11 depth charges; 2 × Machine guns

HMS Campbeltown was a Batch 3 Type 22 frigate of the British Royal Navy. Built by Cammell Laird in Birkenhead. She was part of the third batch of Type 22s, which were larger than their predecessors and incorporated advanced close-in weapons after lessons learnt from the 1982 Falklands War. She was decommissioned on 7 April 2011.

== History ==
In August 2001, she visited Arkhangelsk, Russia for the 60th-anniversary of the Arctic Convoys. In company with Russian warships Zadorniy and Alexander Otrakovski. On 28 August 2001, as part of the same goodwill visit, Campbeltown laid a wreath in the Barents Sea close to where Russian submarine Kursk was lost on 12 August 2000.

Campbeltown's last deployment was a seven-month tour from 2007 to 2008 in the Persian Gulf, where she operated in support of Operation Calash, a Counter Piracy and counter smuggling operation within the Arabian Sea, Gulf of Aden, and North Indian Ocean and Operation Telic, the security of Iraqi Territorial Seas. In early 2004 the vessel was deployed as part of NATO's Standing Naval Force Atlantic. HMS Campbeltown entered refit in September 2008.

The ship's bell of the first HMS Campbeltown, a Second World War Town-class destroyer famous for her role in the St Nazaire Raid, was loaned from Campbelltown, Pennsylvania to the current Campbeltown for the duration of her Royal Navy service.

== Decommissioning ==
The Royal Navy announced in March 2011 that Campbeltown would be decommissioned on 7 April 2011. She paid a final visit to her namesake town of Campbeltown, Argyll in March 2011 where a series of ceremonies, including a town centre parade by the ship's crew, took place to commemorate the end of the ship's active service. Campbeltown made her final entrance to Plymouth on 31 March 2011 before decommissioning in a traditional ceremony on 7 April 2011. She was laid up at Portsmouth and in July 2013 sold to Turkish company Leyal for demolition. She was towed from Portsmouth to Turkey on 15 Oct 2013, arrived Aliağa on 29 October 2013.

The ship's bell has now been returned to Campbelltown, Pennsylvania. The ship's bell made specifically for the next HMS Campbeltown, a Type 31 frigate, was given to Campbeltown, in Argyll and Bute, Scotland and will be displayed in the town's museum until the new ship is commissioned.

== Affiliations ==
Campbeltown was affiliated with a number of military and civic bodies:

- J Battery, 3 Regiment, Royal Horse Artillery
- No. 24 Squadron RAF
- Worshipful Company of Wax Chandlers
- Campbeltown, Argyll
- Campbelltown, Pennsylvania
- Springbank Distillery, Campbeltown, Argyll
- Birmingham Nautical Club
- TS Campbeltown
- Bridgewater Sea Cadet Corps
- Royal Marine Cadet Corps, Bradfield College, Reading
- CCF Naval Section, Gordon's School, Woking
