= Judge Advocate General of the Armed Forces =

UK judge responsible for court martials

- Incumbent; Judge Alan Large since 1 October 2020
- Style: His Honour
- Abbreviation: JAG
- Appointer: Sovereign of the United Kingdom
- Formation: 2006
- First holder: Jeff Blackett
- Website: Official website

In the United Kingdom, the Judge Advocate General is a judge responsible for the Court Martial process within the Royal Navy, British Army and Royal Air Force. As such the post has existed since 2006; prior to this date the Judge Advocate General's authority related to the Army and the RAF while the Judge Advocate of the Fleet was the equivalent with regard to the Royal Navy.

== Origins ==
A Judge Martial is recorded as serving under the Earl of Leicester in the Netherlands in 1587–88. There were judge advocates on both sides during the English Civil War and following the Restoration the office of Judge Advocate of the Army (soon to be known as Judge Advocate General) was established on a permanent basis in 1666. Since 1682 the Judge Advocate General has been appointed by letters patent of the sovereign; until 1892 most judge advocates were Members of Parliament, indeed from 1806 the office was a political one, the holder resigning on a change of government.

After 1892 the role of Judge Advocate General became a judicial rather than a ministerial office; at first it was combined with the President of the Probate Divorce and Admiralty Division before being made fully independent in 1905.

The Judge Advocate General has been entitled to appoint deputies since 1682.

== Role ==
The Judge Advocate General is Head of the Service Justice System. The Judge Advocate General is the senior judge advocate and is the overall lead for the jurisdiction (i.e. is not under the authority of the Lord Chief Justice or any other presiding judge).

The Judge Advocate General is assisted by a team of judges who comprise the permanent judiciary, plus a small staff of civil servants. There is a total of seven judges, comprising one vice-judge advocate general, and six Assistant judge advocates general, all of whom must be barristers or advocates of seven years standing. Only judges appointed by the JAG may preside over proceedings in the Service courts, which comprise the Court Martial, the Summary Appeal Court, and the Service Civilian Court. The judges control the practice and procedure, give rulings on legal matters, and sum up the evidence for the jury (known as a "board"). Defendants are entitled to a defending counsel or solicitor, and their unit may provide an accused's assisting officer if they so wish. The Judge Advocate General has higher authority over all units in the Armed Forces such as intelligence and combat units. The Judge Advocate General is equivalent to the position of Secretary of State for Defence.

The Judge Advocate General's office holds cases deposited the originals of all records of proceedings, which are kept for at least six years.

=== Historic role ===
Historically the Judge Advocate General had responsibility for prosecuting cases as well as for summoning and supervising the court. In 1923 moves were made to separate responsibility for prosecutions from the judicial responsibilities of the Judge Advocate General's office; complete separation was achieved 25 years later with the establishment of the Directorate of Army Legal Services in the War Office (and a parallel Directorate in the Air Ministry).

=== Changes in the 2000s ===
In the 1990s significant changes to the courts-martial system were instigated following European Court of Human Rights judgments. The Judge Advocate General was formerly the legal adviser of the armed forces, a role that ended in 2000. In both naval and military cases, all proceedings in the military courts of the United Kingdom are held under his or her authority (the former office of Judge Advocate of the Fleet having been amalgamated into that of the Judge Advocate General in 2006). Previously the Royal Navy, the British Army and the Royal Air Force had separate court martial arrangements, but all three Services have operated under a single system of service law since November 2009.

The former practice of reviewing the findings and sentences of all trials of the old courts-martial was abolished in October 2009. Now the outcome of each trial in the court martial (now a standing court) is final, subject to appeal to the Court Martial Appeal Court. The Judge Advocate General has the authority to be the trier of fact for all cases, set rules, standards, procedures, and regulations for the Military courts of the United Kingdom.

== Qualifications ==
The post is regulated by the Courts-Martial (Appeals) Act 1951. The appointment is made by the British Sovereign on the recommendation of the Lord Chancellor. Formerly, the Judge Advocate General had to be a barrister, advocate, or solicitor with higher rights of audience, of ten years' standing. As of 21 July 2008 the experience needed to qualify was reduced in line with a general move to broaden diversity in the judiciary. An appointee who has practised in England and Wales now has to satisfy the judicial-appointment eligibility condition on a seven-year basis, while a practitioner from Scotland or Northern Ireland will need seven-years' standing as barrister, advocate or solicitor. The post is always held by a civilian rather than a commissioned officer, however an appointee may have previously been a member of the armed forces. In practice the post is held by a senior circuit judge.

== List of judge advocates general ==
Through 1847, the dates are those of actual entrance upon office, not of the appointment, which is usually a few days earlier; or of the patent, commonly some days later than those adopted in this list. After 1847 the dates are those of the London Gazette notices of the appointment.

- January 1666: Samuel Barrowe
- 1684: George Clarke
- 1705: Thomas Byde
- 1715: Edward Hughes
- 1734: Sir Henry Hoghton
- 1741: Thomas Morgan
- 1768: Sir Charles Gould-Morgan
- 8 March 1806: Nathaniel Bond
- 4 December 1807: Richard Ryder
- 8 November 1809: Charles Manners-Sutton
- 25 June 1817: Sir John Beckett
- 12 May 1827: James Abercromby
- 2 February 1828: Sir John Beckett
- 2 December 1830: Sir Robert Grant
- 7 July 1834: Robert Cutlar Fergusson
- 22 December 1834: Sir John Beckett
- 25 April 1835: Robert Cutlar Fergusson
- 6 November 1838: William St Julien Arabin
- 21 February 1839: Sir George Grey
- 26 June 1841: Richard Lalor Sheil
- 14 September 1841: John Iltyd Nicholl
- 31 January 1846: James Stuart Wortley
- 14 July 1846: Charles Buller
- 30 December 1847: William Goodenough Hayter
- 26 May 1849: Sir David Dundas
- 28 February 1852: George Bankes
- 30 December 1852: Charles Pelham Villiers
- 13 March 1858: John Mowbray
- 24 June 1859: Thomas Emerson Headlam
- 12 July 1866: John Mowbray
- 16 December 1868: Sir Colman Michael O'Loghlen
- 28 December 1870: John Robert Davison
- 17 May 1871: Sir Robert Joseph Phillimore (held office pending a rearrangement of its duties)
- 21 August 1873: Acton Smee Ayrton
- 7 March 1874: Stephen Cave
- 24 November 1875: George Cavendish-Bentinck
- 7 May 1880: George Osborne Morgan
- 13 July 1885: William Thackeray Marriott
- 22 February 1886: John William Mellor
- 9 August 1886: William Thackeray Marriott
- 13 December 1892: Sir Francis Jeune
- 31 August 1905: Thomas Milvain
- 7 October 1916: Sir Felix Cassel
- 21 September 1934: Colonel Sir Henry MacGeagh
- 1 January 1955: Captain Sir Frederick Gentle
- 1 January 1963: Wing Commander Sir Oliver Barnett
- 1 April 1968: Wing Commander Brian Duncan
- 1 August 1972: Harold Dean
- 1 August 1979: Major John Morgan-Owen
- 24 August 1984: James Stuart-Smith
- 1 February 1991: James Rant (died)
- 1 November 2004: Jeff Blackett
- 1 October 2020: Alan Macdonald Large

Includes material from: Haydn's Book of Dignities, 12th ed. (1894; reprinted 1969)

== See also ==
- Judge-advocate
- Judge Advocate General
- Judge Advocate of the Fleet
- Judge Advocate General's Corps (United States)
- Judge Advocate General (Canada)
