= List of acts of the Parliament of the United Kingdom from 1848 =

This is a complete list of acts of the Parliament of the United Kingdom for the year 1848.

Note that the first parliament of the United Kingdom was held in 1801; parliaments between 1707 and 1800 were either parliaments of Great Britain or of Ireland). For acts passed up until 1707, see the list of acts of the Parliament of England and the list of acts of the Parliament of Scotland. For acts passed from 1707 to 1800, see the list of acts of the Parliament of Great Britain. See also the list of acts of the Parliament of Ireland.

For acts of the devolved parliaments and assemblies in the United Kingdom, see the list of acts of the Scottish Parliament, the list of acts of the Northern Ireland Assembly, and the list of acts and measures of Senedd Cymru; see also the list of acts of the Parliament of Northern Ireland.

The number shown after each act's title is its chapter number. Acts passed before 1963 are cited using this number, preceded by the year(s) of the reign during which the relevant parliamentary session was held; thus the Union with Ireland Act 1800 is cited as "39 & 40 Geo. 3 c. 67", meaning the 67th act passed during the session that started in the 39th year of the reign of George III and which finished in the 40th year of that reign. Note that the modern convention is to use Arabic numerals in citations (thus "41 Geo. 3" rather than "41 Geo. III"). Acts of the last session of the Parliament of Great Britain and the first session of the Parliament of the United Kingdom are both cited as "41 Geo. 3".

Some of these acts have a short title. Some of these acts have never had a short title. Some of these acts have a short title given to them by later acts, such as by the Short Titles Act 1896.

== 11 & 12 Vict. ==
Continuing the first session of the 15th Parliament of the United Kingdom, which met from 18 November 1847 until 5 September 1848.

=== Public general acts ===
Short title	Citation	Royal assent
Long title
Supply Act 1848 or the Consolidated Fund Act 1948 (repealed)	11 & 12 Vict. c. 4	7 March 1848
An Act to apply the Sum of Eight Millions out of the Consolidated Fund to the Service of the Year One thousand eight hundred and forty-eight. (Repealed by Statute Law Revision Act 1875 (38 & 39 Vict. c. 66))
Government of New Zealand Act 1848 (repealed)	11 & 12 Vict. c. 5	7 March 1848
An Act to suspend for Five Years the Operation of certain Parts of an Act of the Tenth Year of Her present Majesty, (Note: Government of New Zealand Act 1846 (9 & 10 Vict. c. 103)) for making further Provision for the Government of the New Zealand Islands; and to make other Provision in lieu thereof. (Repealed by Statute Law Revision Act 1891 (54 & 55 Vict. c. 67))
Passengers to North America Act 1848 (repealed)	11 & 12 Vict. c. 6	28 March 1848
An Act to make further Provision for One Year, and to the End of the then next Session of Parliament, for the Carriage of Passengers by Sea to North America. (Repealed by Passengers Act 1849 (12 & 13 Vict. c. 33))
Queen's Prison Act 1848 (repealed)	11 & 12 Vict. c. 7	28 March 1848
An Act to amend an Act for consolidating the Queen's Bench, Fleet and Marshalsea Prison, and for regulating the Queens Prison. (Repealed by Statute Law Revision Act 1875 (38 & 39 Vict. c. 66))
Income Tax Act 1848 (repealed)	11 & 12 Vict. c. 8	13 April 1848
An Act to continue for Three Years the Duties on Profits arising from Property, Professions, Trades, and Offices. (Repealed by Statute Law Revision Act 1875 (38 & 39 Vict. c. 66))
Stamp Duties Act 1848 (repealed)	11 & 12 Vict. c. 9	13 April 1848
An Act to continue for Three Years the Stamp Duties granted by an Act of the Fifth and Sixth Years of Her present Majesty, (Note: Stamp Duties (Ireland) Act 1842 (5 & 6 Vict. c. 82)) to assimilate the Stamp Duties in Great Britain and Ireland, and to make Regulations for collecting and managing the same. (Repealed by Statute Law Revision Act 1875 (38 & 39 Vict. c. 66))
Court of Chancery Act 1848 (repealed)	11 & 12 Vict. c. 10	13 April 1848
An Act for empowering certain Officers of the High Court of Chancery to administer Oaths and take Declarations and Affirmations. (Repealed by Commissioners for Oaths Act 1889 (52 & 53 Vict. c. 10))
Mutiny Act 1848 (repealed)	11 & 12 Vict. c. 11	22 April 1848
An Act for punishing Mutiny and Desertion, and for the better Payment of the Army and their Quarters. (Repealed by Statute Law Revision Act 1875 (38 & 39 Vict. c. 66))
Treason Felony Act 1848	11 & 12 Vict. c. 12	22 April 1848
An Act for the better Security of the Crown and Government of the United Kingdom.
Mining Leases (Ireland) Act 1848 (repealed)	11 & 12 Vict. c. 13	22 April 1848
An Act for amending the Law for the leasing of Mines in Ireland. (Repealed for Northern Ireland by Statute Law Revision Act 1875 (38 & 39 Vict. c. 66) and Statute Law Revision Act (Northern Ireland) 1954 (c. 35 (N.I.)) and for the Republic of Ireland by Land and Conveyancing Law Reform Act 2009 (No. 27 (I)))
Borough Police Act 1848 (repealed)	11 & 12 Vict. c. 14	22 April 1848
An Act for authorizing a Borough Police Superannuation Fund. (Repealed by County and Borough Police Act 1859 (22 & 23 Vict. c. 32))
Marine Mutiny Act 1848 (repealed)	11 & 12 Vict. c. 15	22 April 1848
An Act for the Regulation of Her Majesty's Royal Marine Forces while on shore. (Repealed by Statute Law Revision Act 1875 (38 & 39 Vict. c. 66))
Exchequer Bills Act 1848 (repealed)	11 & 12 Vict. c. 16	22 April 1848
An Act for raising the Sum of Seventeen millions nine hundred and forty-six thousand five hundred Pounds by Exchequer Bills, for the Service of the Year One thousand eight hundred and forty-eight. (Repealed by Statute Law Revision Act 1875 (38 & 39 Vict. c. 66))
Public Works (Ireland) Act 1848 (repealed)	11 & 12 Vict. c. 17	22 April 1848
An Act to amend the Act of the present Session (Note: Public Works (Ireland) Act 1848 (11 & 12 Vict. c. 1)) to facilitate the Completion of Public Works in Ireland. (Repealed by Statute Law Revision Act 1875 (38 & 39 Vict. c. 66))
Election Recognizances Act 1848 (repealed)	11 & 12 Vict. c. 18	5 May 1848
An Act to remove certain Doubts as to the Law for the Trial of controverted Elections. (Repealed by Statute Law Revision Act 1875 (38 & 39 Vict. c. 66))
Indemnity Act 1848 (repealed)	11 & 12 Vict. c. 19	9 June 1848
An Act to indemnify such Persons in the United Kingdom as have omitted to qualify themselves for Offices and Employments, and to extend the Time limited for those Purposes respectively until the Twenty-fifth Day of March One thousand eight hundred and forty-nine. (Repealed by Promissory Oaths Act 1871 (34 & 35 Vict. c. 48))
Aliens Act 1848 (repealed)	11 & 12 Vict. c. 20	9 June 1848
An Act to authorize for One Year, and to the End of the then next Session of Parliament, the Removal of Aliens from the Realm. (Repealed by Statute Law Revision Act 1875 (38 & 39 Vict. c. 66))
Indian Insolvency Act 1848 (repealed)	11 & 12 Vict. c. 21	9 June 1848
An Act to consolidate and amend the Laws relating to Insolvent Debtors in India. (Repealed by Statute Law Revision Act 1875 (38 & 39 Vict. c. 66), Statute Law Revision Act 1878 (41 & 42 Vict. c. 79), Statute Law Revision Act 1891 (54 & 55 Vict. c. 67) and Presidency Towns Insolvency Act 1909 (No. III (India)))
Islands of Tobago, etc. Act 1848 (repealed)	11 & 12 Vict. c. 22	9 June 1848
An Act for granting Relief to the Island of Tobago, and for aiding the Colonies of British Guiana and Trinidad in raising Money for the Promotion of Immigration of free Labourers. (Repealed by Statute Law Revision Act 1875 (38 & 39 Vict. c. 66))
National Monument in Scotland Act 1848	11 & 12 Vict. c. 23	9 June 1848
An Act to alter and amend an Act passed in the Third Year of the Reign of His Majesty King George the Fourth, intituled "An Act to incorporate the Contributors for the Erection of a National Monument in Scotland to commemorate the Naval and Military Victory obtained during the late War." (Note: National Monument in Scotland Act 1822 (3 Geo. 4. c. 100))
Disfranchisement of Freemen, Great Yarmouth Act 1848 (repealed)	11 & 12 Vict. c. 24	30 June 1848
An Act for disfranchising the Freemen of the Borough of Great Yarmouth. (Repealed by Statute Law Revision Act 1875 (38 & 39 Vict. c. 66))
Poor Relief (Ireland) Act 1848 (repealed)	11 & 12 Vict. c. 25	30 June 1848
An Act to extend the Powers given by former Acts for purchasing or hiring Land in connexion with or for the Use of Workhouses in Ireland; and for providing for the Burial of the Poor. (Repealed for Northern Ireland by Statute Law Revision Act 1875 (38 & 39 Vict. c. 66), Statute Law Revision Act 1891 (54 & 55 Vict. c. 67), Local Government (Ireland) Act 1898 (61 & 62 Vict. c. 37), Welfare Services Act (Northern Ireland) 1949 (c. 1 (N.I.)) and Children and Young Persons Act (Northern Ireland) 1950 (c. 5 (N.I.)) and for the Republic of Ireland by Public Assistance Act 1939 (No. 27))
Grand Jury Cess (Ireland) Act 1848	11 & 12 Vict. c. 26	30 June 1848
An Act to remove Difficulties in the Appointment of Collectors of Grand Jury Cess in Ireland in certain Cases, and to remove Doubts as to the Jurisdiction of the Divisional Justices of the Police District of Dublin Metropolis relating to the Recovery of Poor Rates, and other Cases. (Repealed for the Republic of Ireland by Statute Law Revision Act 2007 (No. 28))
Inclosures (Provisional Orders) Act 1848	11 & 12 Vict. c. 27	22 July 1848
An Act to authorize the Inclosure of certain Lands, in pursuance of the Third and also of a Special Report of the Inclosure Commissioners for England and Wales.
Execution (Ireland) Act 1848 (repealed)	11 & 12 Vict. c. 28	22 July 1848
An Act to amend the Law of Imprisonment for Debt in Ireland, and to improve the Remedies for the Recovery of Debts and of the Possession of Tenements situate in Cities and Towns, in certain Cases. (Repealed by Judgments (Enforcement) Act (Northern Ireland) 1969 (c. 30 (N.I.)))
Hares Act 1848 (repealed)	11 & 12 Vict. c. 29	22 July 1848
An Act to enable Persons having a Right to kill Hares in England and Wales to do so, by themselves or Persons authorized by them, without being required to take out a Game Certificate. (Repealed by Regulatory Reform (Game) Order 2007 (SI 2007/2007))
Hares (Scotland) Act 1848 (repealed)	11 & 12 Vict. c. 30	22 July 1848
An Act to enable all Persons having at present a Right to kill Hares in Scotland to do so themselves, or by Persons authorized by them, without being required to take out a Game Certificate. (Repealed by Statute Law Revision Act 1875 (38 & 39 Vict. c. 66), Statute Law Revision Act 1891 (54 & 55 Vict. c. 67), Finance Act 1937 (1 Edw. 8 & 1 Geo. 6 c. 54) and Wildlife and Natural Environment (Scotland) Act 2011 (asp 6))
Poor Law Procedure Act 1848 or the County Law Procedure Act 1848 (repealed)	11 & 12 Vict. c. 31	22 July 1848
An Act to amend the Procedure in respect of Orders for the Removal of the Poor in England and Wales, and Appeals therefrom.. (Repealed by Poor Law Act 1927 (17 & 18 Geo. 5. c. 14))
County Cess (Ireland) Act 1848 (repealed)	11 & 12 Vict. c. 32	22 July 1848
An Act to facilitate the Collection of County Cess in Ireland. (Repealed by Local Government (Ireland) Act 1898 (61 & 62 Vict. c. 37))
Supply (No. 2) Act 1848 (repealed)	11 & 12 Vict. c. 33	22 July 1848
An Act to apply the Sum of Three Millions out of the Consolidated Fund to the Service of the Year One thousand eight hundred and forty-eight. (Repealed by Statute Law Revision Act 1875 (38 & 39 Vict. c. 66))
Appeals on Civil Bills, Dublin Act 1848 (repealed)	11 & 12 Vict. c. 34	22 July 1848
An Act to amend certain Acts in force in Ireland in relation to Appeals from Decrees and Dismisses on Civil Bills in the County of Dublin and County of the City of Dublin. (Repealed by Civil Bill Courts (Ireland) Act 1851 (14 & 15 Vict. c. 57))
Habeas Corpus Suspension (Ireland) Act 1848 (repealed)	11 & 12 Vict. c. 35	25 July 1848
An Act to empower the Lord Lieutenant or other Chief Governor or Governors of Ireland to apprehend, and detain until the First Day of March One thousand eight hundred and forty-nine, such Persons as he or they shall suspect of conspiring against Her Majesty's Person and Government. (Repealed by Statute Law Revision Act 1875 (38 & 39 Vict. c. 66))
Entail Amendment Act 1848	11 & 12 Vict. c. 36	14 August 1848
An Act for the amendment of the law of entail in Scotland.
Church Building Act 1848 (repealed)	11 & 12 Vict. c. 37	14 August 1848
An Act to amend the Law relative to the Assignment of Ecclesiastical Districts. (Repealed by Statute Law (Repeals) Act 1974 (c. 22) and for the Isle of Man by Isle of Man (Church Building and New Parishes) Act 1897 (60 & 61 Vict. c. 33))
West India Loans Act 1848 (repealed)	11 & 12 Vict. c. 38	14 August 1848
An Act to authorize the West India Relief Commissioners to grant further Time for the Repayment of Monies advanced by them in certain Cases. (Repealed by West India Loan Act 1879 (42 & 43 Vict. c. 16))
Prisons Act 1848 (repealed)	11 & 12 Vict. c. 39	14 August 1848
An Act to facilitate the raising of Money by Corporate Bodies for building or repairing Prisons. (Repealed by Prison Act 1865 (28 & 29 Vict. c. 126))
Roads and Bridges (Scotland) Act 1848 (repealed)	11 & 12 Vict. c. 40	14 August 1848
An Act to alter the Mode of assessing the Funds leviable in the County of Inverness, for making and maintaining certain Roads and Bridges and other Works in the Highlands of Scotland. (Repealed by Education (Scotland) Act 1878 (41 & 42 Vict. c. 78) and Local Government (Scotland) Act 1889 (52 & 53 Vict. c. 50))
Ecclesiastical Unions, etc. (Ireland) Act 1848 (repealed)	11 & 12 Vict. c. 41	14 August 1848
An Act to amend the Laws relating to the Ecclesiastical Unions and Divisions of Parishes in Ireland. (Repealed by Statute Law Revision Act 1894 (57 & 58 Vict. c. 56))
Indictable Offences Act 1848	11 & 12 Vict. c. 42	14 August 1848
An Act to facilitate the Performance of the Duties of Justices of the Peace out of Sessions within England and Wales with respect to Persons charged with indictable Offences.
Summary Jurisdiction Act 1848 or the Duties of Justices (Summary Convictions) Act 1848 or Jervis's Act (repealed)	11 & 12 Vict. c. 43	14 August 1848
An Act to facilitate the Performance of the Duties of Justices of the Peace out of Sessions, within England and Wales, with respect to summary Convictions and Orders. (Repealed for England and Wales by Courts Act 1971 (c. 23) and for Northern Ireland by Criminal Justice (Northern Ireland) Order 1980 (SI 1980/704 (N.I. 6)))
Justices Protection Act 1848 (repealed)	11 & 12 Vict. c. 44	14 August 1848
An Act to protect Justices of the Peace from Vexatious Actions for Acts done by them in Execution of their Office. (Repealed by Justices of the Peace Act 1979 (c. 55))
Joint Stock Companies Act 1848 or the Joint Stock Companies Winding-up Act 1848 (repealed)	11 & 12 Vict. c. 45	14 August 1848
An Act to amend the Acts for facilitating the winding up the Affairs of Joint Stock Companies unable to meet their pecuniary Engagements; and also to facilitate the Dissolution and winding up of Joint Stock Companies and other Partnerships. (Repealed by Companies Act 1862 (25 & 26 Vict. c. 89))
Criminal Procedure Act 1848 (repealed)	11 & 12 Vict. c. 46	14 August 1848
An Act for the Removal of Defects in the Administration of Criminal Justice. (Repealed for England and Wales by Criminal Statutes Repeal Act 1861 (24 & 25 Vict. c. 95), Statute Law Revision Act 1875 (38 & 39 Vict. c. 66) and Indictments Act 1915 (5 & 6 Geo. 5 c. 90), for Northern Ireland by Statute Law Revision Act 1875 (38 & 39 Vict. c. 66), Statute Law Revision Act 1891 (54 & 55 Vict. c. 67) and Indictments Act (Northern Ireland) 1945 (c. 16 (N.I.)) and for the Republic of Ireland by Criminal Justice (Administration) Act 1924 (No. 44))
Eviction (Ireland) Act 1848	11 & 12 Vict. c. 47	14 August 1848
An Act for the Protection and Relief of the destitute Poor evicted from their Dwellings in Ireland.
Incumbered Estates (Ireland) Act 1848 (repealed)	11 & 12 Vict. c. 48	14 August 1848
An Act to facilitate the Sale of Incumbered Estates in Ireland. (Repealed by Statute Law Revision Act 1892 (55 & 56 Vict. c. 19))
Sale of Beer, etc. on Sunday Act 1848 (repealed)	11 & 12 Vict. c. 49	14 August 1848
An Act for regulating the Sale of Beer and other Liquors on the Lord's Day. (Repealed by Statute Law Revision Act 1875 (38 & 39 Vict. c. 66))
Regent's Quadrant Colonnade Act 1848	11 & 12 Vict. c. 50	14 August 1848
An Act to empower the Commissioners of Her Majesty's Woods to remove the Colonnade in the Regents Quadrant.
Public Works (Ireland) Act 1848 (repealed)	11 & 12 Vict. c. 51	14 August 1848
An Act to provide additional Funds for Loans for Drainage and other Works of public Utility in Ireland. (Repealed by Statute Law Revision Act 1875 (38 & 39 Vict. c. 66))
Salmon Fisheries Act 1848 (repealed)	11 & 12 Vict. c. 52	14 August 1848
An Act to explain the Acts for preventing the Destruction of the Breed of Salmon and Fish of the Salmon Kind. (Repealed by Salmon Fishery Act 1861 (24 & 25 Vict. c. 109))
Windsor Castle Act 1848	11 & 12 Vict. c. 53	14 August 1848
An Act to empower the Commissioners of Her Majesty's Woods to make certain Alterations and Improvements in the Approaches to the Castle and Town of Windsor.
Caledonian Canal Act 1848	11 & 12 Vict. c. 54	14 August 1848
An Act for incorporating the Commissioners of the Caledonian Canal, and for vesting the Crinan Canal in the said Commissioners.
Paymaster General Act 1848	11 & 12 Vict. c. 55	14 August 1848
An Act for consolidating the Offices of Paymasters of Exchequer Bills and Paymaster of Civil Services with the Office of Paymaster General, and for making other Provisions in regard to the consolidated Offices.
Canada Union Act 1848 (repealed)	11 & 12 Vict. c. 56	14 August 1848
An Act to repeal so much of an Act of the Third and Fourth Years of Her present Majesty, (Note: British North America Act 1840 (3 & 4 Vict. c. 35)) to re-unite the Provinces of Upper and Lower Canada, and for the Government of Canada, as relates to the Use of the English Language in Instruments relating to the Legislative Council and Legislative Assembly of the Province of Canada. (Repealed by Statute Law Revision Act 1878 (41 & 42 Vict. c. 79))
Exchange of Crown Advowsons Act 1848	11 & 12 Vict. c. 57	14 August 1848
An Act to enable Her Majesty to exchange the Advowson of the Vicarage of Stoneleigh in the County of Warwick for the Advowsons of the Rectory of Yoxall in the County of Stafford and the Perpetual Curacy of Hunningham in the County of Warwick.
Naval Medical Supplement Fund Society Act 1848 (repealed)	11 & 12 Vict. c. 58	14 August 1848
An Act to authorize for Ten Years, and to the End of the then next Session of Parliament, the Regulation of the Annuities and Premiums of the Naval Medical Supplemental Fund Society. (Repealed by Naval Medical Compassionate Fund Act 1915 (5 & 6 Geo. 5. c. 28) (Note: Incorrectly cited as "1815 c. 28" in the Chronological Table of the Statutes.))
Juvenile Offenders (Ireland) Act 1848 (repealed)	11 & 12 Vict. c. 59	14 August 1848
An Act for the more speedy Trial and Punishment of Juvenile Offenders in Ireland. (Repealed by Summary Jurisdiction (Ireland) Act 1850 (13 & 14 Vict. c. 102))
Duties on Spirits Act 1848 (repealed)	11 & 12 Vict. c. 60	14 August 1848
An Act to alter the Duties payable upon the Importation of Spirits or Strong Waters. (Repealed by Customs Consolidation Act 1853 (16 & 17 Vict. c. 107))
Diocese of Norwich Act 1848	11 & 12 Vict. c. 61	14 August 1848
An Act to effect an Exchange of Ecclesiastical Patronage between Her Majesty and the Earl of Leicester, and for the Severance and Consolidation of certain Benefices in the Diocese of Norwich, and for other Ecclesiastical Purposes.
Land Tax Commissioners Act 1848 (repealed)	11 & 12 Vict. c. 62	14 August 1848
An Act to appoint additional Commissioners for executing the Acts for granting a Land Tax and other Rates and Taxes. (Repealed by Statute Law Revision Act 1950 (14 Geo. 6. c. 6))
Public Health Act 1848 or the Health of Towns Act 1848 (repealed)	11 & 12 Vict. c. 63	31 August 1848
An Act for promoting the Public Health. (Repealed by Public Health Act 1875 (38 & 39 Vict. c. 55))
Loan Societies Act 1848 (repealed)	11 & 12 Vict. c. 64	31 August 1848
An Act to continue until the First Day of October One thousand eight hundred and forty-nine, and to the End of the then next Session of Parliament, an Act (Note: Loan Societies Act 1840 (3 & 4 Vict. c. 110)) to amend the Laws relating to Loan Societies. (Repealed by Statute Law Revision Act 1875 (38 & 39 Vict. c. 66))
Militia Ballots Suspension Act 1848 (repealed)	11 & 12 Vict. c. 65	31 August 1848
An Act to suspend until the First Day of October One thousand eight hundred and forty-nine the making of Lists and the Ballots and Enrolments for the Militia of the United Kingdom. (Repealed by Statute Law Revision Act 1875 (38 & 39 Vict. c. 66))
Highway Rates Act 1848 (repealed)	11 & 12 Vict. c. 66	31 August 1848
An Act to continue to the First Day of October One thousand eight hundred and forty-nine, and to the End of the then next Session of Parliament, an Act (Note: Application of Highway Rates to Turnpikes Act 1841 (4 & 5 Vict. c. 59)) for authorizing the Application of Highway Rates to Turnpike Roads. (Repealed by Statute Law Revision Act 1875 (38 & 39 Vict. c. 66))
Ecclesiastical Jurisdiction Act 1848 (repealed)	11 & 12 Vict. c. 67	31 August 1848
An Act for further continuing until the First Day of August One thousand eight hundred and forty-nine, and to the End of the then next Session of Parliament, certain temporary Provisions concerning Ecclesiastical Jurisdiction in England. (Repealed by Statute Law Revision Act 1875 (38 & 39 Vict. c. 66))
Trustees Relief (Ireland) Act 1848 (repealed)	11 & 12 Vict. c. 68	31 August 1848
An Act for extending to Ireland an Act passed in the last Session of Parliament, intituled "An Act for better securing Trust Funds, and for the Relief of Trustees." (Note: Trustees Relief Act 1847 (10 & 11 Vict. c. 96)) (Repealed by Trustee Act 1893 (56 & 57 Vict. c. 53))
Malicious Injuries (Ireland) Act 1848 (repealed)	11 & 12 Vict. c. 69	31 August 1848
An Act to repeal so much of an Act of the Parliament of Ireland of the Twenty-third and Twenty-fourth Years of King George the Third, "for the more effectually punishing such Persons as shall by Violence obstruct the Freedom of Corn Markets and the Corn Trade, and who shall be guilty of other Offences therein mentioned, and for making Satisfaction to the Parties injured," (Note: Obstruction of Trade Act 1783 (23 & 24 Geo. 3. c. 20 (I))) as relates to the making of Satisfaction to the Parties injured; and to substitute other Provisions in lieu thereof; and to repeal the Provisions of the Acts which give Remedies against any Hundreds or Baronies in Ireland in respect of Robbery. (Repealed for Northern Ireland by Criminal Injuries Act (Northern Ireland) 1956 (c. 19 (N.I.)) and for the Republic of Ireland by Malicious Injuries Act 1981 (No. 9))
Fines and Recoveries Act 1848 (repealed)	11 & 12 Vict. c. 70	31 August 1848
An Act for dispensing with the Evidence of the Proclamations on Fines levied in the Court of Common Pleas at Westminster. (Repealed by Statute Law Revision Act 1875 (38 & 39 Vict. c. 66))
Church Building Commission Act 1848 (repealed)	11 & 12 Vict. c. 71	31 August 1848
An Act to continue to the Twentieth Day of July One thousand eight hundred and fifty-three, and to the End of the then next Session of Parliament, Her Majesty's Commission for building new Churches. (Repealed by Statute Law Revision Act 1875 (38 & 39 Vict. c. 66))
Constabulary (Ireland) Act 1848 (repealed)	11 & 12 Vict. c. 72	31 August 1848
An Act to amend the Acts relating to the Constabulary Force in Ireland, and to amend the Provisions for the Payment of Special Constables. (Repealed for Northern Ireland by Police (Northern Ireland) Act 1998 (c. 32) and for the Republic of Ireland by Statute Law Revision Act 2007 (No. 28))
Turnpike Acts (Ireland) Act 1848 (repealed)	11 & 12 Vict. c. 73	31 August 1848
An Act to continue until the Thirty-first Day of July One thousand eight hundred and forty-nine, and to the End of the then Session of Parliament, certain Acts for regulating Turnpike Roads in Ireland. (Repealed by Statute Law Revision Act 1875 (38 & 39 Vict. c. 66))
Registers of Sasines (Scotland) Act 1848 (repealed)	11 & 12 Vict. c. 74	31 August 1848
An Act to authorize the Lords of Council and Session to regulate the Rates or Dues of Registration to be charged by the Keepers of the Registers of Sasines, Reversions, &c. in Scotland. (Repealed by Statute Law Revision Act 1892 (55 & 56 Vict. c. 19))
Militia Pay Act 1848 (repealed)	11 & 12 Vict. c. 75	31 August 1848
An Act to defray until the First Day of August One thousand eight hundred and forty-nine the Charge of the Pay, Clothing, and contingent and other Expenses of the Disembodied Militia in Great Britain and Ireland; to grant Allowances in certain Cases to Subaltern Officers, Adjutants, Paymasters, Quartermasters, Surgeons, Assistant Surgeons, Surgeons Mates, and Serjeant Majors of the Militia; and to authorize the Employment of the Non-commissioned Officers. (Repealed by Statute Law Revision Act 1875 (38 & 39 Vict. c. 66))
Ecclesiastical Patronage (Ireland) Act 1848 (repealed)	11 & 12 Vict. c. 76	31 August 1848
An Act to enable Archbishops and Bishops and other Persons in Ireland to compromise Suits touching their Rights of Patronage as to Ecclesiastical Benefices, in certain Cases. (Repealed by Statute Law Revision Act 1894 (57 & 58 Vict. c. 56))
Insolvent Debtors, Court Act 1848 (repealed)	11 & 12 Vict. c. 77	31 August 1848
An Act to authorize the Application of Part of the unclaimed Money in the Court for the Relief of Insolvent Debtors in enlarging the Court-House of the said Court. (Repealed by Bankruptcy Repeal and Insolvent Court Act 1869 (32 & 33 Vict. c. 83))
Crown Cases Act 1848 (repealed)	11 & 12 Vict. c. 78	31 August 1848
An Act for the further Amendment of the Administration of the Criminal Law. (Repealed by Criminal Appeal Act 1966 (c. 31))
Justiciary (Scotland) Act 1848 (repealed)	11 & 12 Vict. c. 79	31 August 1848
An Act to facilitate and simplify Procedure in the Court of Justiciary in Scotland. (Repealed by Statute Law (Repeals) Act 1989 (c. 43))
Tithe Rentcharge (Ireland) Act 1848	11 & 12 Vict. c. 80	31 August 1848
An Act to empower Lessees of Tithe Rent-charge in Ireland to deduct a Proportion of Poor Rate Poundage from Rent; and also to empower the Ecclesiastical Commissioners in Ireland to allow Sums paid for Poor Rate or County Cess, or Poundage deducted from Ecclesiastical Persons on account of Poor Rate, among the Deductions from the Valuation of Ecclesiastical Property directed to be made under an Act of the Third and Fourth Years of His late Majesty, (Note: Church Temporalities (Ireland) Act 1833 (3 & 4 Will. 4. c. 37)) for the Purpose of a certain Tax thereby imposed upon such Property in Ireland. (Repealed for the Republic of Ireland by Land and Conveyancing Law Reform Act 2009 (No. 27))
Steam Navigation Act 1848 (repealed)	11 & 12 Vict. c. 81	31 August 1848
An Act for the further Regulation of Steam Navigation and for limiting in certain Cases the Number of Passengers to be conveyed in Steam Vessels. (Repealed by Steam Navigation Act 1851 (14 & 15 Vict. c. 79))
Poor Law (Schools) Act 1848 (repealed)	11 & 12 Vict. c. 82	31 August 1848
An Act to amend the Law for the Formation of Districts for the Education of Infant Poor. (Repealed by Poor Law Act 1927 (17 & 18 Geo. 5. c. 14) (Note: Incorrectly cited as "1927 c. 15" in the Chronological Table of the Statutes.))
Assessionable Manors Award Act 1848	11 & 12 Vict. c. 83	31 August 1848
An Act to confirm the Awards of Assessionable Manors Commissioners, and for other Purposes relating to the Duchies of Cornwall and Lancaster.
Chelsea and Greenwich Out-pensioners, etc. Act 1848 (repealed)	11 & 12 Vict. c. 84	31 August 1848
An Act to amend the Acts for rendering effective the Service of the Chelsea and Greenwich Out-Pensioners, and to extend them to the Pensioners of the East India Company. (Repealed by Reserve Force Act 1867 (30 & 31 Vict. c. 110))
Poor Rates Act 1848 (repealed)	11 & 12 Vict. c. 85	31 August 1848
An Act to continue to the First Day of October One thousand eight hundred and forty-nine, and to the End of the then next Session of Parliament, the Exemption of Inhabitants from Liability to be rated as such in respect of Stock in Trade or other Property to the Relief of the Poor. (Repealed by Statute Law Revision Act 1875 (38 & 39 Vict. c. 66))
Bankrupts Release Act 1848 (repealed)	11 & 12 Vict. c. 86	31 August 1848
An Act to empower Commissioners of the Court of Bankruptcy to order the Release of Bankrupts from Prison in certain Cases. (Repealed by Bankrupt Law Consolidation Act 1849 (12 & 13 Vict. c. 106))
Debts Recovery Act 1848 (repealed)	11 & 12 Vict. c. 87	31 August 1848
An Act to extend the Provisions of an Act passed in the First Year of His late Majesty King William the Fourth, intituled "An Act for consolidating and amending the Laws for facilitating the Payment of Debts out of Real Estate." (Note: Debts Recovery Act 1830 (11 Geo. 4 & 1 Will. 4. c. 47)) (Repealed for England and Wales by Administration of Estates Act 1925 (15 & 16 Geo. 5 c. 23), for Northern Ireland by Statute Law Revision Act 1875 (38 & 39 Vict. c. 66), Statute Law Revision Act 1891 (54 & 55 Vict. c. 67) and Administration of Estates Act (Northern Ireland) 1955 (c. 24 (N.I.)) and for the Republic of Ireland by Succession Act 1965 (No. 27))
Post Office (Money Orders) Act 1848 (repealed)	11 & 12 Vict. c. 88	31 August 1848
An Act for further regulating the Money Order Department of the Post Office. (Repealed by Post Office Act 1908 (8 Edw. 7. c. 48))
Unlawful Combinations (Ireland) Act 1848 (repealed)	11 & 12 Vict. c. 89	31 August 1848
An Act to continue for Two Years, and to the End of the then next Session of Parliament, and to amend, an Act of the Second and Third Years of Her present Majesty, intituled "An Act to extend and render more effectual for Five Years an Act passed in the Fourth Year of His late Majesty George the Fourth, (Note: Unlawful Oaths (Ireland) Act 1823 (4 Geo. 4. c. 87)) to amend an Act passed in the Fiftieth Year of His Majesty George the Third, (Note: Unlawful Oaths (Ireland) Act 1810 (50 Geo. 3. c. 102)) for presenting the administering and taking unlawful Oaths in Ireland." (Note: Unlawful Societies (Ireland) Act 1839 (2 & 3 Vict. c. 74)) (Repealed by Statute Law Revision Act 1891 (54 & 55 Vict. c. 67))
Parliamentary Elections Act 1848 (repealed)	11 & 12 Vict. c. 90	31 August 1848
An Act to regulate the Times of Payment of Rates and Taxes by Parliamentary Electors. (Repealed by Representation of the People Act 1918 (7 & 8 Geo. 5. c. 64))
Poor Law Audit Act 1848 (repealed)	11 & 12 Vict. c. 91	31 August 1848
An Act to make Provision for the Payment of Parish Debts, the Audit of Parochial and Union Accounts, and the Allowance of certain Charges therein. (Repealed by Statute Law Revision Act 1966 (c. 5))
Fisheries (Ireland) Act 1848 (repealed)	11 & 12 Vict. c. 92	31 August 1848
An Act for the Protection and Improvement of the Salmon, Trout, and other Inland Fisheries of Ireland. (Repealed for Northern Ireland by Fisheries Act (Northern Ireland) 1966 (c. 17 (N.I.)) and for the Republic of Ireland by Fisheries (Consolidation) Act 1959 (No. 14))
Incorporation of Boroughs Act 1848 (repealed)	11 & 12 Vict. c. 93	31 August 1848
An Act to confirm the Incorporation of certain Boroughs. (Repealed by Municipal Corporations Act 1882 (45 & 46 Vict. c. 50))
Court of Chancery Offices Act 1848 (repealed)	11 & 12 Vict. c. 94	31 August 1848
An Act to regulate certain Offices in the Petty Bag in the High Court of Chancery, the Practice of the Common Law Side of that Court, and the Enrolment Office of the said Court. (Repealed by Great Seal (Offices) Act 1874 (37 & 38 Vict. c. 81))
Wolverhampton Parish Act 1848 or the Wolverhampton Church Act 1848	11 & 12 Vict. c. 95	31 August 1848
An Act to carry into effect the Arrangements of the Ecclesiastical Commissioners for England for making better Provision for the Cure of Souls in the Parish of Wolverhampton in the County of Stafford and Diocese of Lichfield.
Turnpike Acts Continuance Act 1848 (repealed)	11 & 12 Vict. c. 96	31 August 1848
An Act to continue certain Turnpike Acts for limited Periods. (Repealed by Statute Law Revision Act 1875 (38 & 39 Vict. c. 66))
Sugar Duties Act 1848 (repealed)	11 & 12 Vict. c. 97	4 September 1848
An Act to repeal the Duties of Customs upon the Importation of Sugar, and to impose new Duties in lieu thereof. (Repealed by Customs Consolidation Act 1853 (16 & 17 Vict. c. 107))
Election Petitions Act 1848 (repealed)	11 & 12 Vict. c. 98	4 September 1848
An Act to amend the Law for the Trial of Election Petitions. (Repealed by Parliamentary Elections Act 1868 (31 & 32 Vict. c. 125))
Inclosure Act 1848	11 & 12 Vict. c. 99	4 September 1848
An Act to further extend the Provisions of the Act (Note: Inclosure Act 1845 (8 & 9 Vict. c. 118)) for the Inclosure and Improvement of Commons.
Distillation of Spirits from Sugar, etc. Act 1848 (repealed)	11 & 12 Vict. c. 100	4 September 1848
An Act to permit the Distillation of Spirits from Sugar, Molasses, and Treacle in the United Kingdom. (Repealed by Spirits Act 1860 (23 & 24 Vict. c. 114))
Lock-up Houses Act 1848 (repealed)	11 & 12 Vict. c. 101	4 September 1848
An Act to provide for the Expenses of erecting and maintaining Lock-up Houses on the Borders of Counties. (Repealed by Statute Law Revision Act 1958 (6 & 7 Eliz. 2. c. 46))
Crown Lands Act 1848 (repealed)	11 & 12 Vict. c. 102	4 September 1848
An Act to enlarge the Powers of an Act (Note: Battersea Park Act 1846 (9 & 10 Vict. c. 38)) empowering the Commissioners of Her Majesty's Woods to form a Royal Park in Battersea Fields; to facilitate the raising of Monies authorized to be raised by the said Commissioners for Metropolitan Improvements; and to regulate and simplify the Mode of keeping the Accounts of the Commissioners of Her Majesty's Woods. (Repealed by Statute Law Revision Act 1875 (38 & 39 Vict. c. 66), Statute Law Revision Act 1891 (54 & 55 Vict. c. 67), Statute Law Revision Act 1894 (57 & 58 Vict. c. 56), Crown Estate Act 1956 (4 & 5 Eliz. 2 c. 73), Statute Law Revision Act 1958 (6 & 7 Eliz. 2 c. 46) and Crown Estate Act 1961 (9 & 10 Eliz. 2 c. 55))
Army Prize Money Act 1848 (repealed)	11 & 12 Vict. c. 103	4 September 1848
An Act to authorize the Application of a Sum of Money out of the forfeited and unclaimed Army Prize Fund in purchasing the Site of the Royal Military Asylum, and in improving such Asylum. (Repealed by Statute Law Revision Act 1894 (57 & 58 Vict. c. 56))
Millbank Prison Act 1848 (repealed)	11 & 12 Vict. c. 104	4 September 1848
An Act for amending the Act (Note: Millbank Prison Act 1843 (6 & 7 Vict. c. 26)) for regulating the Prison at Millbank. (Repealed by Millbank Prison Act 1892 (55 & 56 Vict. c. 1))
Importation of Sheep Act 1848 (repealed)	11 & 12 Vict. c. 105	4 September 1848
An Act to prohibit the Importation of Sheep, Cattle, or other Animals, for the Purpose of preventing the Introduction of contagious or infectious Disorders. (Repealed by Contagious Diseases (Animals) Act 1869 (32 & 33 Vict. c. 70))
Labouring Poor (Ireland) Act 1848 (repealed)	11 & 12 Vict. c. 106	4 September 1848
An Act to amend an Act of the Tenth Year of Her present Majesty, (Note: Poor Relief (Ireland) (No. 1) Act 1847 (10 & 11 Vict. c. 10)) for rendering valid certain Proceedings for the Relief of Distress in Ireland by Employment of the Labouring Poor, and to indemnify those who have acted in such Proceedings. (Repealed by Statute Law Revision Act 1875 (38 & 39 Vict. c. 66))
Contagious Disorders (Sheep), etc. Act 1848 (repealed)	11 & 12 Vict. c. 107	4 September 1848
An Act to prevent, until the First Day of September One thousand eight hundred and fifty, and to the End of the then Session of Parliament, the spreading of contagious or infectious Disorders among Sheep, Cattle, and other Animals. (Repealed by Contagious Diseases (Animals) Act 1869 (32 & 33 Vict. c. 70))
Diplomatic Relations with See of Rome Act 1848 (repealed)	11 & 12 Vict. c. 108	4 September 1848
An Act for enabling Her Majesty to establish and maintain Diplomatic Relations with the Sovereign of the Roman States. (Repealed by Statute Law Revision Act 1875 (38 & 39 Vict. c. 66))
Inclosures Act 1848	11 & 12 Vict. c. 109	4 September 1848
An Act to authorize the Inclosure of certain Lands in pursuance of a Special Report of the Inclosure Commissioners for England and Wales.
Poor Law Amendment Act 1848 (repealed)	11 & 12 Vict. c. 110	4 September 1848
An Act to alter the Provisions relating to the Charges for the Relief of the Poor in Unions. (Repealed by Local Government Act 1948 (11 & 12 Geo. 6. c. 26))
Poor Removal Act 1848 (repealed)	11 & 12 Vict. c. 111	4 September 1848
An Act to amend an Act of the Tenth Year of Her present Majesty, (Note: Poor Removal Act 1846 (9 & 10 Vict. c. 66)) for amending the Laws relating to the Removal of the Poor. (Repealed by Poor Law Act 1927 (17 & 18 Geo. 5. c. 14))
Metropolitan Commissioners of Sewers Act 1848 (repealed)	11 & 12 Vict. c. 112	4 September 1848
An Act to consolidate, and continue in force for Two Years and to the End of the then next Session of Parliament, the Metropolitan Commissions of Sewers. (Repealed by Statute Law Revision Act 1875 (38 & 39 Vict. c. 66))
Dublin Police Act 1848 (repealed)	11 & 12 Vict. c. 113	4 September 1848
An Act for the further Amendment of the Acts relating to the Dublin Police. (Repealed by Statute Law (Repeals) Act 2013 (c. 2))
Poor Law Auditors Act 1848 (repealed)	11 & 12 Vict. c. 114	4 September 1848
An Act to prevent District Auditors from taking Proceedings in certain Cases. (Repealed by Statute Law Revision Act 1875 (38 & 39 Vict. c. 66))
Irish Reproductive Loan Fund Act 1848 (repealed)	11 & 12 Vict. c. 115	4 September 1848
An Act to vest in Her Majesty the Property of the Irish Reproductive Loan Fund Institution, and to dissolve the said Institution. (Repealed by Statute Law Revision Act 1875 (38 & 39 Vict. c. 66))
Slave Trade Act 1848 (repealed)	11 & 12 Vict. c. 116	4 September 1848
An Act for carrying into effect the Treaty between Her Majesty and the Republic of the Equator (Note: Republic of the Equator is the official name of Ecuador.) for the Abolition of the Traffic in Slaves. (Repealed by Slave Trade Act 1873 (36 & 37 Vict. c. 88))
Post Office Act 1848 (repealed)	11 & 12 Vict. c. 117	4 September 1848
An Act for rendering certain Newspapers published in the Channel Islands and the Isle of Man liable to Postage. (Repealed by Post Office Act 1870 (33 & 34 Vict. c. 79))
Excise Act 1848 (repealed)	11 & 12 Vict. c. 118	4 September 1848
An Act to explain and amend the Law respecting Proceedings for Duties and Penalties under the Post Horse, Stage, and Hackney Carriage Acts in the United Kingdom. (Repealed by Customs and Excise Act 1952 (15 & 16 Geo. 6 & 1 Eliz. 2. c. 44))
Public Money Drainage Act 1848 (repealed)	11 & 12 Vict. c. 119	4 September 1848
An Act to simplify the Forms of Certificates under the Act (Note: Public Money Drainage Act 1846 (9 & 10 Vict. c. 101)) authorizing the Advance of Money for the Improvement of Land by Drainage in Great Britain. (Repealed by Statute Law Revision Act 1958 (6 & 7 Eliz. 2. c. 46))
Land Transfer (Ireland) Act 1848 (repealed)	11 & 12 Vict. c. 120	4 September 1848
An Act to facilitate the Transfer of Landed Property in Ireland. (Repealed by Judgments (Enforcement) Act (Northern Ireland) 1969 (c. 30 (N.I.)))
Liqueur Act 1848 (repealed)	11 & 12 Vict. c. 121	4 September 1848
An Act to alter the Laws and Regulations of Excise respecting the Survey of Dealers in and Retailers of Spirits, and respecting the Sale and Removal of Spirits by Permit from the Stock of such Traders; and respecting the Distribution of Penalties and Forfeitures recovered under the Laws of Excise. (Repealed by Customs and Excise Act 1952 (15 & 16 Geo. 6 & 1 Eliz. 2. c. 44))
Bonded Warehouses Act 1848 (repealed)	11 & 12 Vict. c. 122	4 September 1848
An Act to amend the Laws respecting the Warehousing of British Spirits in England, Scotland, and Ireland respectively, and to permit Spirits made from Malt only, and Spirits made from Malt and other Grain, and Rectified Spirits, to be exported on Drawback from any Part of the United Kingdom; and respecting certain Spirit Mixtures, and the Removal of Goods subject to Excise Regulations from Customs Warehouse. (Repealed by Customs and Excise Act 1952 (15 & 16 Geo. 6 & 1 Eliz. 2. c. 44))
Nuisances Removal and Diseases Prevention Act 1848 (repealed)	11 & 12 Vict. c. 123	4 September 1848
An Act to renew and amend an Act of the Tenth Year of Her present Majesty, for the more speedy Removal of certain Nuisances, and the Prevention of contagious and epidemic Diseases. (Repealed for England by Nuisances Removal Act for England 1855 (18 & 19 Vict. c. 121) and for Wales, Scotland and Ireland by Sanitary Act 1866 (29 & 30 Vict. c. 90))
London Bridge Approaches Act 1848	11 & 12 Vict. c. 124	4 September 1848
An Act to amend an Act of the last Session, (Note: London Bridge Approaches Fund Act 1847 (10 & 11 Vict. c. 115)) for varying the Priorities of the Charges made on "The London Bridge Approaches Fund," and to facilitate the Completion of certain Improvements in the City of Westminster.
National Debt Act 1848 (repealed)	11 & 12 Vict. c. 125	5 September 1848
An Act for raising the Sum of Two Millions by Exchequer Bills, or by the Creation of Annuities, for the Service of the Year One thousand eight hundred and forty-eight. (Repealed by Statute Law Revision Act 1870 (33 & 34 Vict. c. 69))
Appropriation Act 1848 (repealed)	11 & 12 Vict. c. 126	5 September 1848
An Act to apply a Sum out of the Consolidated Fund, and certain other Sums, to the Service of the Year One thousand eight hundred and forty-eight; and to appropriate the Supplies granted in this Session of Parliament. (Repealed by Statute Law Revision Act 1875 (38 & 39 Vict. c. 66))
Duties on Copper and Lead Act 1848 (repealed)	11 & 12 Vict. c. 127	5 September 1848
An Act to reduce the Duties on Copper and Lead. (Repealed by Statute Law Revision Act 1875 (38 & 39 Vict. c. 66))
Slave Trade (Muscat) Act 1848 (repealed)	11 & 12 Vict. c. 128	5 September 1848
An Act for carrying into effect the Agreement between Her Majesty and the Imaum of Muscat (Note: Said bin Sultan, Sultan of Muscat and Oman) for the more effectual Suppression of the Slave Trade. (Repealed by Slave Trade Act 1873 (36 & 37 Vict. c. 88))
Local Acts (Preliminary Inquiries) Act 1848 (repealed)	11 & 12 Vict. c. 129	5 September 1848
An Act for amending an Act passed in the Ninth and Tenth Years of Her present Majesty (Note: Local Acts (Preliminary Inquiries) Act 1846 (9 & 10 Vict. c. 106)) for making preliminary Inquiries in certain Cases of Applications for Local Acts. (Repealed by Preliminary Inquiries Act 1851 (14 & 15 Vict. c. 49))
West Indian Loans Act 1848 (repealed)	11 & 12 Vict. c. 130	5 September 1848
An Act for guaranteeing the Interest on such Loans, not exceeding Five hundred thousand Pounds, as may be raised by the British Colonies on the Continent of South America, in the West Indies, and the Mauritius, for certain Purposes. (Repealed by Statute Law Revision Act 1891 (54 & 55 Vict. c. 67))
Fever (Ireland) Act 1848 (repealed)	11 & 12 Vict. c. 131	5 September 1848
An Act to amend, and continue until the First Day of November One thousand eight hundred and forty-nine, and to the End of the then next Session of Parliament, an Act (Note: Fever (Ireland) Act 1846 (9 & 10 Vict. c. 6)) to make Provision for the Treatment of poor Persons afflicted with Fever in Ireland. (Repealed by Statute Law Revision Act 1875 (38 & 39 Vict. c. 66))
Taxing Masters (Ireland) Act 1848 (repealed)	11 & 12 Vict. c. 132	5 September 1848
An Act for the appointment of additional Taxing Masters for the High Court of Chancery in Ireland, and to regulate the Appointment of the principal Assistants to the Masters in the Superior Courts of Law in Ireland. (Repealed by Judicature (Northern Ireland) Act 1978 (c. 23))
Savings Banks (Ireland) Act 1848 (repealed)	11 & 12 Vict. c. 133	5 September 1848
An Act to amend the Laws relating to Savings Banks in Ireland. (Repealed by Statute Law Revision Act 1878 (41 & 42 Vict. c. 79))

=== Local acts ===
Short title	Citation	Royal assent
Long title
Kettering Rates Act 1848 (repealed)	11 & 12 Vict. c. i	22 April 1848
An Act for better assessing and collecting the Poor Rates, Lighting, Watching, and Highway Rates, in the Parish of Kettering in the County of Northampton. (Repealed by Statute Law (Repeals) Act 2008 (c. 12))
Leicester Cemetery Act 1848 (repealed)	11 & 12 Vict. c. ii	5 May 1848
An Act for enabling the Mayor, Aldermen, and Burgesses of the Borough of Leicester to establish a general Cemetery for such Borough. (Repealed by Leicestershire Act 1985 (c. xvii))
Manchester General Cemetery Act 1848	11 & 12 Vict. c. iii	9 June 1848
An Act for the Consecration of a Portion of the Manchester General Cemetery.
Clifton Suspension Bridge Act 1848 (repealed)	11 & 12 Vict. c. iv	9 June 1848
An Act for extending the Time for building a Bridge the River Avon from Clifton to the opposite Side of River in the County of Somerset. (Repealed by Clifton Suspension Bridge Act 1952 (15 & 16 Geo. 6 & 1 Eliz. 2. c. xli))
Leicester Navigation Act 1848	11 & 12 Vict. c. v	9 June 1848
An Act to authorize the Company of Proprietors of the Leicester Navigation to abandon the Railways or Stone Roads and Water Levels commonly known as "The Forest Line," and to enable them to sell the Lands over which the same passes, and the Reservoir and other Works connected therewith.
Folkestone Waterworks Act 1848	11 & 12 Vict. c. vi	9 June 1848
An Act for supplying the Parish and Township or Borough of Folkestone with Water.
Lambeth Waterworks Act 1848	11 & 12 Vict. c. vii	9 June 1848
An Act to enable the Company of Proprietors of Lambeth Waterworks to construct additional Works, and for better supplying the Inhabitants of the Parish of Lambeth in the County of Surrey and other Parishes and Places with Water.
Stirling Waterworks Act 1848	11 & 12 Vict. c. viii	9 June 1848
An Act for the better supplying with Water the Royal Burgh of Stirling and Suburbs thereof.
Birkenhead Dock Company Act 1848 (repealed)	11 & 12 Vict. c. ix	9 June 1848
An Act to enable the Birkenhead Dock Company to sell or lease their Land. (Repealed by Mersey Dock Acts Consolidation Act 1858 (21 & 22 Vict. c. xcii))
Liverpool Docks Act 1848 (repealed)	11 & 12 Vict. c. x	9 June 1848
An Act to authorize the Trustees of the Liverpool Docks to build Warehouses, to construct additional Wet Docks and other Works, and for other Purposes. (Repealed by Mersey Dock Acts Consolidation Act 1858 (21 & 22 Vict. c. xcii))
Dover Landing Pier Act 1848	11 & 12 Vict. c. xi	9 June 1848
An Act for constructing and maintaining a Pier, Jetty, or Stage, with necessary Approaches thereto, at Dover in the County of Kent.
Morley Gas Act 1848 (repealed)	11 & 12 Vict. c. xii	9 June 1848
An Act for lighting with Gas the Township of Morley in the Parish of Batley in the West Riding of the County of York. (Repealed by West Yorkshire Act 1980 (c. xiv))
Bristol and Clifton Gas Act 1848 (repealed)	11 & 12 Vict. c. xiii	9 June 1848
An Act for amending "The Bristol and Clifton Gaslight Act, 1847". (Note: Bristol and Clifton Gaslight Act 1847 (10 & 11 Vict. c. xxvii)) (Repealed by Bristol United Gaslight Company Act 1853 (16 & 17 Vict. c. lxxxiv))
Southampton Gas Act 1848	11 & 12 Vict. c. xiv	9 June 1848
An Act for incorporating the Southampton Gaslight Company and for supplying at a limited Price the Town and Neighbourhood of Southampton with Gas.
Worcester New Gaslight Amendment Act 1848	11 & 12 Vict. c. xv	9 June 1848
An Act to amend and enlarge the Provisions of an Act passed in the Ninth and Tenth Years of the Reign of Her present Majesty, intituled "An Act for better supplying with Gas the City of Worcester and the Suburbs thereof," (Note: Worcester New Gas Light Act 1846 (9 & 10 Vict. c. ccxvii)) and to enable the Worcester New Gaslight Company incorporated by the said Act to raise a further Sum of Money.
Shrewsbury Cattle Market Act 1848	11 & 12 Vict. c. xvi	9 June 1848
An Act for providing a Market for the Sale of Cattle and other Animals in the Borough of Shrewsbury in the County of Salop.
Magdalen Hospital Amendment Act 1848 (repealed)	11 & 12 Vict. c. xvii	9 June 1848
An Act to alter, amend, and enlarge the Powers and Provisions of an Act passed in the Ninth Year of the Reign of His Majesty King George the Third, (Note: Magdalen Hospital Act 1769 (9 Geo. 3. c. 31)) for establishing and governing the Magdalen Hospital. (Repealed by Statute Law (Repeals) Act 2013 (c. 2))
Port of London (Public Sufferance Wharves) Act 1848 (repealed)	11 & 12 Vict. c. xviii	9 June 1848
An Act for the Regulation of certain public Sufferance Wharves in the Port of London. (Repealed by Statute Law (Repeals) Act 1993 (c. 50))
Leicester Lunatic Asylum Act 1848 (repealed)	11 & 12 Vict. c. xix	9 June 1848
An Act to effect an Agreement between the Visitors of the Lunatic Asylum for the County of Leicester and the Corporation of the Borough of Leicester, for the Admission of Lunatic Paupers from the said Borough into the said Asylum. (Repealed by Leicester Corporation Act 1956 (4 & 5 Eliz. 2. c. xlix))
Price's Patent Candle Company's Act 1848 (repealed)	11 & 12 Vict. c. xx	9 June 1848
An Act for the Incorporation, Establishment, and Regulation of "Price's Patent Candle Company," and for enabling the said Company to purchase and work Letters Patent. (Repealed by Price's Patent Candle Company's Act 1853 (16 & 17 Vict. c. xl))
Midland Railway's Extension to Hitchin, Northampton and Huntingdon Railway (Wellingborough Deviations) Act 1848 (repealed)	11 & 12 Vict. c. xxi	30 June 1848
An Act to authorize certain Alterations in the Hitchin, Northampton, and Huntingdon Extension of the Midland Railways; and for other Purposes. (Repealed by Midland Railway (Leicester and Hitchin) Act 1853 (16 & 17 Vict. c. cviii))
North Western Railway (Diversions at Skipton, Casterton and Sedburgh, and on Lancaster Branch at Bulk) Act 1848	11 & 12 Vict. c. xxii	30 June 1848
An Act for enabling the North-Western Railway Company to make certain Alterations and Diversions in the Main Line of their Railway at Skipton, Casterton, and Sedbergh, and in the Lancaster Branch of their Railway at Bulk.
Aberdare Railway Act 1848	11 & 12 Vict. c. xxiii	30 June 1848
An Act to authorize the leasing of the Aberdare Railway, with the Branch Railway and Works connected therewith, to the Taff Vale Railway Company.
York, Newcastle and Berwick Railway (Main Line Improvement) Act 1848	11 & 12 Vict. c. xxiv	30 June 1848
An Act for enabling the York, Newcastle, and Berwick Railway Company to improve their Main Line of Railway, and to make certain Branches in the County of Durham; and for other Purposes.
North British Railway (Increase and Division of Capital) Act 1848 (repealed)	11 & 12 Vict. c. xxv	30 June 1848
An Act to empower the North British Railway Company to raise additional Capital for certain Purposes. (Repealed by North British Railway Consolidation Act 1858 (21 & 22 Vict. c. cix))
Kendal and Windermere Railway Amendment Act 1848	11 & 12 Vict. c. xxvi	30 June 1848
An Act to enable the Kendal and Windermere Railway Company to raise a further Sum of Money, and to amend the Act (Note: Kendal and Windermere Railway Act 1845 (8 & 9 Vict. c. xxxii)) relating to such Railway.
Vale of Neath Railway Amendment Act 1848	11 & 12 Vict. c. xxvii	30 June 1848
An Act for enabling the South Wales Railway Company to hold Shares in the Undertaking of the Vale of Neath Railway Company; and for other Purposes.
Bristol and Exeter Railway (Glastonbury Navigation and Canal Purchase) Act 1848	11 & 12 Vict. c. xxviii	30 June 1848
An Act for enabling the Bristol and Exeter Railway Company to purchase the Glastonbury Navigation and Canal, and for amending the Acts relating to such Railway and Canal.
Waterford, Wexford, Wicklow and Dublin Railway Amendment Act 1848	11 & 12 Vict. c. xxix	30 June 1848
An Act to amend the Acts relating to the Waterford, Wexford, Wicklow, and Dublin Railway, and to enable the South Wales Railway Company to subscribe thereto.
Norfolk Railway Amendment Act 1848 (repealed)	11 & 12 Vict. c. xxx	30 June 1848
An Act to enable the Norfolk Railway Company to raise a further Sum of Money, and for other Purposes. (Repealed by Great Eastern Railway Act 1862 (25 & 26 Vict. c. ccxxiii))
Great Yarmouth (Coal Duties and Maintenance of St. George's Chapel) Act 1848	11 & 12 Vict. c. xxxi	30 June 1848
An Act for abolishing the Duties now payable under the Act of 7 Geo. 1, (Note: Saint George's Chapel and Street Lighting, Yarmouth Act 1720 (7 Geo. 1. St. 1. c. 11)) commonly called Saint George's Chapel Act, and for otherwise varying the Provisions thereof, and enacting other Duties and Provisions in lieu thereof.
Lanark and Hamilton Court House and County Rates Act 1848	11 & 12 Vict. c. xxxii	30 June 1848
An Act to raise a further Sum of Money for the Court House and Offices at Hamilton, and to alter the Mode assessing and levying certain Rates and Assessments in the County of Lanark.
Oswestry Markets and Fairs Act 1848	11 & 12 Vict. c. xxxiii	30 June 1848
An Act for removing and regulating the Markets and Fairs held in the Borough and Liberties of Oswestry, and for completing and providing convenient Market Places and Places for Fairs, with proper Approaches thereto.
East and West Looe Harbour and Bridge Act 1848	11 & 12 Vict. c. xxxiv	30 June 1848
An Act for maintaining and improving the Harbour of Looe in the County of Cornwall, and for taking down the present Bridge between East and West Looe across the said Harbour, and erecting a new Bridge instead thereof.
Barrow Harbour Act 1848 (repealed)	11 & 12 Vict. c. xxxv	30 June 1848
An Act for maintaining, regulating, and improving the Harbour of Barrow in the County Palatine of Lancaster. (Repealed by Furness Railway and Barrow Harbour Act 1863 (26 & 27 Vict. c. lxxxix))
Derby Waterworks Act 1848	11 & 12 Vict. c. xxxvi	30 June 1848
An Act for better supplying with Water the Borough of Derby and certain Parishes and Places adjacent thereto, in the County of Derby.
Oxford Improvement Act 1848	11 & 12 Vict. c. xxxvii	30 June 1848
An Act to amend Three Acts of His Majesty King George the Third, (Note: Oxford Improvement Act 1771 (11 Geo. 3. c. 19)) (Note: Oxford Improvement Act 1781 (21 Geo. 3. c. 47)) (Note: Oxford Improvement Act 1812 (52 Geo. 3. c. lxxii)) and another Act of His late Majesty King William the Fourth, (Note: Oxford Improvement Act 1835 (5 & 6 Will. 4. c. lxix)) for amending certain Mileways leading to Oxford, and making Improvements in the University and City of Oxford, the Suburbs thereof, and adjoining Parish of Saint Clement; and for other Purposes.
Liverpool United Gaslight Company's Act 1848	11 & 12 Vict. c. xxxviii	30 June 1848
An Act to amalgamate the Liverpool Gaslight Company and the Liverpool New Gas and Coke Company.
Brentford, Turnham Green, Hammersmith and Kensington Gas Act 1848 or the Brentford Gas Act 1848	11 & 12 Vict. c. xxxix	30 June 1848
An Act to amend and enlarge the Powers of an Act passed in the Second Year of the Reign of His Majesty King George the Fourth, (Note: Brentford Gas Act 1821 (1 & 2 Geo. 4. c. 69)) and of an Act passed in the Sixth Year of the Reign of Her present Majesty, (Note: Brentford Gas Act 1842 (5 & 6 Vict. c. lxxviii)) for supplying the Towns of Old and New Brentford in the County of Middlesex, and other Places therein mentioned, with Gas.
Brighton Gaslight Act 1848	11 & 12 Vict. c. xl	30 June 1848
An Act to repeal the Provisions of Two several Acts for lighting with Gas the Town of Brighthelmstone in the County of Sussex and for making other Provisions in lieu thereof.
Forth and Clyde Navigation and Airdrie and Coatbridge Water Act 1848 (repealed)	11 & 12 Vict. c. xli	30 June 1848
An Act to authorize the Company of Proprietors of the Forth and Clyde Navigation and the Airdrie and Coatbridge Water Company to enter into Agreements for certain Purposes. (Repealed by Airdrie, Coatbridge and District Water Board Order Confirmation Act 1923 (13 & 14 Geo. 5. c. li))
Herculaneum Dock Company Act 1848	11 & 12 Vict. c. xlii	30 June 1848
An Act to enable the Herculaneum Dock Company to sell or lease Lands at Toxteth Park in the County of Lancaster.
Bristol Dock Company Act 1848	11 & 12 Vict. c. xliii	30 June 1848
An Act for facilitating the Transfer of the Bristol Docks to the Mayor, Aldermen, and Burgesses of the City of Bristol, and for other Purposes.
Queensferry Passage Improvement Act 1848	11 & 12 Vict. c. xliv	30 June 1848
An Act for the further Extension and Improvement of the Ferry, Harbours, Piers, and other Works at Queensferry on the Frith of Forth; and for certain other Purposes connected therewith.
Tyne Direct Ferry Company Act 1848	11 & 12 Vict. c. xlv	30 June 1848
An Act for establishing direct Steam Communications across the River Tyne between the Towns of North and South Shields, and between other Places in the Counties of Durham and Northumberland.
Northern Assurance Company Act 1848 (repealed)	11 & 12 Vict. c. xlvi	30 June 1848
An Act for incorporating the North of Scotland Fire and Life Assurance Company, under the Name of "The Northern Assurance Company;" for enabling the said Company to sue and be sued, and to take, hold, and transfer Property; for confirming the Rules and Regulations of the said Company; and for other Purposes relating thereto. (Repealed by Northern Assurance Act 1865 (28 & 29 Vict. c. cxxiii))
Patent Galvanized Iron Company's Enabling Act 1848	11 & 12 Vict. c. xlvii	30 June 1848
An Act for enabling "The Patent Galvanized Iron Company" to purchase and work certain Letters Patent.
Battle Bridge and Holloway Road (Middlesex) Act 1848	11 & 12 Vict. c. xlviii	30 June 1848
An Act for repealing an Act passed in the Sixth Year of the Reign of His Majesty King George the Fourth, (Note: Battle Bridge and Holloway Road (Middlesex) Act 1825 (6 Geo. 4. c. clvi)) for making a Road from Battlebridge to Holloway in the County of Middlesex.
Nantwich to Wheelock Wharf Road Act 1848	11 & 12 Vict. c. xlix	30 June 1848
An Act for repairing the Road from Nantwich to Wheelock Wharf in the County Palatine of Chester; and to repeal an Act passed in the Fifty-sixth Year of the Reign of His Majesty King George the Third; (Note: Nantwich to Wheelock Wharf Turnpike Road Act 1816 (56 Geo. 3. c. xv)) and to continue and extend the Trust.
Dundalk, Castle Blayney and Carrickmacross Turnpike Roads Act 1848 (repealed)	11 & 12 Vict. c. l	30 June 1848
An Act to amend an Act passed in the Eleventh Year of the Reign of His late Majesty King George the Fourth, intituled "An Act for repairing and maintaining the Roads from the Town of Dundalk in the County of Louth to the Towns of Castle Blaney and Carrickmacross in the County of Monaghan." (Note: Dundalk and Castle Blayney and Carrickmacross Roads Act 1830 (11 Geo. 4 & 1 Will. 4. c. cxii)) (Repealed by Turnpikes Abolition Act (Ireland) 1857 (20 & 21 Vict. c. 16))
Truro Turnpike Roads Act 1848	11 & 12 Vict. c. li	22 July 1848
An Act for repealing an Act of the Ninth Year of the Reign of His Majesty King George the Fourth, intituled "An Act for making, repairing, and improving certain Roads leading to and from Truro in the County of Cornwall, and for making other Provisions in lieu thereof; for forming, vesting, and improving certain Roads; and for continuing and extending the Truro Turnpike Trust." (Note: Truro Roads Act 1828 (9 Geo. 4. c. iii))
Dundee and Perth Railway (Dundee Junction) Act 1848	11 & 12 Vict. c. lii	22 July 1848
An Act to enable the Dundee and Perth Railway Company to make a Junction Line of Railway into the Burgh of Dundee.
Drumpeller Railway Amendment Act 1848	11 & 12 Vict. c. liii	22 July 1848
An Act to continue and amend the Act (Note: Drumpeller Railway Act 1843 (6 & 7 Vict. c. lxiii)) relating to the Drumpeller Railway.
Arbroath and Forfar Railway Act 1848	11 & 12 Vict. c. liv	22 July 1848
An Act to enable the Arbroath and Forfar Railway Company to raise a further Sum of Money.
York, Newcastle and Berwick Railway (Thirsk and Malton) Act 1848	11 & 12 Vict. c. lv	22 July 1848
An Act for enabling the York, Newcastle, and Berwick Railway Company to deviate or alter Part of their Thirsk and Malton Branch Railway, and to abandon Part of the same; and for other Purposes.
Leeds and Thirsk Railway (Melmerby and Northallerton Junction) Act 1848	11 & 12 Vict. c. lvi	22 July 1848
An Act for enabling the Leeds and Thirsk Railway Company to make a Railway from Melmerby to Northallerton, and to form a Junction with the York and Newcastle Railway.
Leeds and Thirsk Railway (Alteration of Levels of Leeds and Hartlepool Railway, &c.) Act 1848	11 & 12 Vict. c. lvii	22 July 1848
An Act for enabling the Leeds and Thirsk Railway Company to alter the Levels of certain Portions of the Leeds and Hartlepool Railway, and to alter the proposed Junctions with the Stockton and Darlington Railway in Eaglescliffe; and for other Purposes.
Manchester South Junction and Altrincham Railway (Station Enlargement, &c.) Act 1848	11 & 12 Vict. c. lviii	22 July 1848
An Act for enabling the Manchester South Junction and Altrincham Railway Company to provide additional Station Accommodation in Manchester; and for other Purposes.
Oxford, Worcester and Wolverhampton Railway (Amendment) Act 1848	11 & 12 Vict. c. lix	22 July 1848
An Act to authorize the Oxford, Worcester, and Wolverhampton Railway Company to raise a further Sum of Money; and for other Purposes.
Chester and Holyhead Railway Act 1848	11 & 12 Vict. c. lx	22 July 1848
An Act to enable the Chester and Holyhead Railway Company to purchase, hire, and use Steam Boats; and for other Purposes.
Waterford and Kilkenny Railway Amendment Act 1848	11 & 12 Vict. c. lxi	22 July 1848
An Act to enable the Waterford and Kilkenny Railway Company to make certain Deviations in the authorized Line of the said Railway; and to amend the Act (Note: Waterford and Kilkenny Railway Act 1845 (8 & 9 Vict. c. lxxxvii)) relating thereto.
East Lincolnshire Railway (Alteration of Great Grimsby Branch) Act 1848	11 & 12 Vict. c. lxii	22 July 1848
An Act to alter the Line of the Great Grimsby Branch of the East Lincolnshire Railway, and to amend and enlarge the Provisions of the Acts relating to the East Lincolnshire Railway.
Manchester, Sheffield and Lincolnshire Railway (Barnsley Junction and Branches) Act 1848 (repealed)	11 & 12 Vict. c. lxiii	22 July 1848
An Act for enabling the Manchester, Sheffield, and Lincolnshire Railway Company to make a Railway to Barnsley, with Branches therefrom, all in the West Riding of the County of York. (Repealed by Manchester, Sheffield and Lincolnshire Railway Act 1849 (12 & 13 Vict. c. lxxxi))
Manchester, Sheffield and Lincolnshire Railway (Station Approach at Manchester) Act 1848 (repealed)	11 & 12 Vict. c. lxiv	22 July 1848
An Act for enabling the Manchester, Sheffield, and Lincolnshire Railway Company to make improved Communications to their Station in Manchester. (Repealed by Manchester, Sheffield and Lincolnshire Railway Act 1849 (12 & 13 Vict. c. lxxxi))
South Yorkshire, Doncaster, and Goole Railway Act 1848	11 & 12 Vict. c. lxv	22 July 1848
An Act to authorize the South Yorkshire, Doncaster, and Goole Railway Company to construct a Branch Railway to the Great Northern Railway at Doncaster.
North Staffordshire Railway (Willington Deviation) Act 1848	11 & 12 Vict. c. lxvi	22 July 1848
An Act to authorize certain Alterations of the North Staffordshire Railway.
Aberdeen Railway Act 1848	11 & 12 Vict. c. lxvii	22 July 1848
An Act to enable the Aberdeen Railway Company to raise a further Sum of Money.
Leeds and Thirsk Railway (Harrogate and Pateley Branch and East and West Yorkshire Junction Railway Amalgamation) Act 1848	11 & 12 Vict. c. lxviii	22 July 1848
An Act for enabling the Leeds and Thirsk Railway Company to make a Railway by Harrogate to Pateley; and for other Purposes.
Manchester, Sheffield and Lincolnshire (Railway Crossing of Sheffield Street, &c.) Act 1848 (repealed)	11 & 12 Vict. c. lxix	22 July 1848
An Act to enable the Manchester, Sheffield, and Lincolnshire Railway Company to carry the Line of their Railway across Sheffield Street in Manchester, to increase their Station Accommodation at Manchester and Stalybridge; and for other Purposes. (Repealed by Manchester, Sheffield and Lincolnshire Railway Act 1849 (12 & 13 Vict. c. lxxxi))
Edinburgh and Glasgow Railway, Amendment and Branches (No. 1) Act 1848 (repealed)	11 & 12 Vict. c. lxx	22 July 1848
An Act to enable the Edinburgh and Glasgow Railway Company to make certain Branches, and to alter the Tunnel at Glasgow; and for other Purposes. (Repealed by Edinburgh and Glasgow Railway Consolidation Act 1852 (15 & 16 Vict. c. cix))
Leeds Central Railway Station Act 1848	11 & 12 Vict. c. lxxi	22 July 1848
An Act for making a Railway Station on the North Side of the River Aire in Leeds in the West Riding of the county of York, to be called "The Leeds Central Railway Station."
Scottish Midland Junction Railway (Amendment and Branches) Act 1848	11 & 12 Vict. c. lxxii	22 July 1848
An Act to enable the Scottish Midland Junction Rail way Company to make Branch Railways to Birnam and to the Dunkeld Branch of the Scottish Midland Junction Railway, and also to abandon Portion of the original Line of the said Dunkeld Branch.
Caledonian Railway (Garnkirk and Clydesdale Improvements) Act 1848	11 & 12 Vict. c. lxxiii	22 July 1848
An Act to enable the Caledonian Railway Company to improve the Glasgow, Garnkirk, and Coatbridge and the Clydesdale Junction Railways.
Great Western Railway, Berks and Hants Extension, Act 1848	11 & 12 Vict. c. lxxiv	22 July 1848
An Act for making a Railway from the Berks and Hants Railway at Hungerford to join the Line of the Wilts, Somerset, and Weymouth Railway at Westbury and Devizes.
Windsor and South Western Railway Deviations Act 1848	11 & 12 Vict. c. lxxv	22 July 1848
An Act for authorizing certain Deviations in the Line of the Windsor, Staines, and South-Western Railway.
Midland Great Western Railway of Ireland (Moate Deviation) Act 1848 (repealed)	11 & 12 Vict. c. lxxvi	22 July 1848
An Act to make a Deviation in the authorized Line of the Midland Great Western Railway of Ireland, and to amend the Acts relating to the Company. (Repealed by Statute Law (Repeals) Act 2013 (c. 2))
Bristol and Exeter Railway (Branch from Bleadon to Wells, Glastonbury and Street) Act 1848	11 & 12 Vict. c. lxxvii	22 July 1848
An Act to enable the Bristol and Exeter Railway Company to make a Branch Railway from the Bristol and Exeter Railway in the Parish of Bleadon to the city of Wells, the Town of Glastonbury, and the Parish of Street, all in the County of Somerset.
Glasgow, Paisley and Greenock Railway Act 1848	11 & 12 Vict. c. lxxviii	22 July 1848
An Act to enable the Glasgow, Paisley, and Greenock Railway Company to make a certain Branch Railway; and to amend the Acts relating to the said Railway.
Londonderry and Enniskillen Railway Amendment Act 1848 (repealed)	11 & 12 Vict. c. lxxix	22 July 1848
An Act to authorize the Abandonment of a Portion of the Londonderry and Enniskillen Railway, and the Enlargement of the intended Station at Londonderry; and for other Purposes. (Repealed by Londonderry and Enniskillen Railway Consolidation Act 1852 (15 & 16 Vict. c. xliv))
Whitehaven Junction Railway (Alteration and Extension) Act 1848	11 & 12 Vict. c. lxxx	22 July 1848
An Act to enable the Whitehaven Junction Railway Company to extend their Railway from the present Terminus thereof at Whitehaven to the Patent Slip Yard in Whitehaven, to make Branches to Whitehaven Harbour, to deviate the Line at Parton, and to alter, enlarge, and extend the Company's Stations, Railways, and Works; and for other Purposes.
York, Newcastle, and Berwick Railway (Hartlepool Dock and Railway, &c. Leasing) Act 1848 (repealed)	11 & 12 Vict. c. lxxxi	22 July 1848
An Act for enabling the Hartlepool Dock and Railway Company and the Great North of England, Clarence, and Hartlepool Junction Railway Company to lease their respective Railways and Works to the York, Newcastle, and Berwick Railway Company. (Repealed by Tees and Hartlepools Port Authority Act 1966 (c. xxv))
Bristol and Exeter Railway (Taunton and Castle Cary Branch) Act 1848	11 & 12 Vict. c. lxxxii	22 July 1848
An Act to enable the Bristol and Exeter Railway Company to make a Branch Railway from the Parish of Lyng, near the Town of Taunton, to join the Wilts, Somerset, and Weymouth Railway near Castle Cary in the County of Somerset.
North Staffordshire Railway (Ashbourne Branch) Act 1848	11 & 12 Vict. c. lxxxiii	22 July 1848
An Act for making a Branch Railway from the Churnet Valley Line of the North Staffordshire Railway in the Parish of Rocester in the County of Stafford to Ashbourne in the County of Derby.
Glasgow, Paisley, Kilmarnock and Ayr Railway Rates Act 1848	11 & 12 Vict. c. lxxxiv	22 July 1848
An Act to regulate the Charges for the Conveyance of Traffic on the Glasgow, Paisley, Kilmarnock, and Ayr Railway, and for other Purposes.
Exeter, Yeovil and Dorchester Railway Act 1848	11 & 12 Vict. c. lxxxv	22 July 1848
An Act for making a Railway from Exeter to Yeovil, with Branches and an Extension therefrom, to be called "The Exeter, Yeovil, and Dorchester Railway."
Manchester, Sheffield and Lincolnshire Railway Act 1848	11 & 12 Vict. c. lxxxvi	22 July 1848
An Act for vesting in the Manchester, Sheffield, and Lincolnshire Railway Company the Canal Navigation from Manchester to or near Ashton-under-Lyne and Oldham.
London and South Western Railway (Salisbury and Yeovil Extension) Act 1848	11 & 12 Vict. c. lxxxvii	22 July 1848
An Act to enable the London and South-Western Railway Company to make a Railway from Salisbury to Yeovil, with Branches to Shaftesbury, and to the Exeter, Yeovil, and Dorchester and Wilts, Somerset, and Weymouth Railways.
Midland Railway (Ripley Branches) Act 1848	11 & 12 Vict. c. lxxxviii	22 July 1848
An Act to enable the Midland Railway Company to make certain Branches from and Enlargements of their Railway; and for other Purposes.
London and South Western and Southampton and Dorchester Railways Amalgamation Act 1848	11 & 12 Vict. c. lxxxix	22 July 1848
An Act for amalgamating the Southampton and Dorchester Railway Company with the London and South-Western Railway Company.
London and Blackwall Railway (Improvement and Branches to St. Katharine's and London Docks) Act 1848	11 & 12 Vict. c. xc	22 July 1848
An Act to amend the Acts relating to the London and Blackwall Railway, and to authorize the Company to alter the Gauge of their Railway, and to make certain Improvements in the Approaches to the said Railway, and to make Branches to the London and Saint Katherine's Docks.
Whitehaven Junction Railway Amendment Act 1848	11 & 12 Vict. c. xci	22 July 1848
An Act to enable the Whitehaven Junction Railway Company to raise a further Sum of Money; and to amend the Act (Note: Whitehaven Junction Railway Act 1844 (7 & 8 Vict. c. lxiv)) relating to the said Railway.
Manchester, Sheffield and Lincolnshire Railway (Humber Ferries Improvement) Act 1848 (repealed)	11 & 12 Vict. c. xcii	22 July 1848
An Act for improving the Steam Communication across the River Humber belonging to the Manchester, Sheffield, and Lincolnshire Railway Company; for erecting a Pier at Kingston-upon-Hull, and enlarging the Works at New Holland; for making a connecting Line near Habrough in the County of Lincoln; for regulating the Pilotage of the Port of Great Grimsby; and for amending the Acts relating to the Manchester, Sheffield, and Lincolnshire Railway Company. (Repealed by Manchester, Sheffield and Lincolnshire Railway Act 1849 (12 & 13 Vict. c. lxxxi))
Manchester, Sheffield and Lincolnshire Railway (Station at Sheffield and Branch to Sheffield Canal) Act 1848 (repealed)	11 & 12 Vict. c. xciii	22 July 1848
An Act to enable the Manchester, Sheffield, and Lincolnshire Railway Company to construct an additional or enlarged Station at Sheffield, and to make a Branch Railway to the Sheffield Canal. (Repealed by Manchester, Sheffield and Lincolnshire Railway Act 1849 (12 & 13 Vict. c. lxxxi))
Sheffield Canal Purchase Act 1848	11 & 12 Vict. c. xciv	22 July 1848
An Act for vesting in the Manchester, Sheffield, and Lincolnshire Railway Company the Sheffield Canal.
Plymouth Great Western Dock (Amendment) Act 1848	11 & 12 Vict. c. xcv	22 July 1848
An Act to enable the Plymouth Great Western Dock Company to raise further Capital, and to authorize the Great Western, the Bristol and Exeter, and South Devon Railway Companies to subscribe to the Plymouth Great Western Docks; and for other Purposes.
Newry Navigation Act 1848	11 & 12 Vict. c. xcvi	22 July 1848
An Act to amend the Acts relating to the Newry Navigation.
Dover Harbour Act 1848 (repealed)	11 & 12 Vict. c. xcvii	22 July 1848
An Act to enable the Warden and Assistants of the Harbour of Dover in the County of Kent to raise a further Sum of Money. (Repealed by Dover Harbour Act 1949 (12, 13 & 14 Geo. 6. c. xxxiv))
Burntisland Harbour Improvement Act 1848 (repealed)	11 & 12 Vict. c. xcviii	22 July 1848
An Act to improve the Harbour of Burntisland in the County of Fife. (Repealed by Forth Ports Authority Order Confirmation Act 1969 (c. xxxiv))
Leck Robie and Littleferry Harbours Act 1848	11 & 12 Vict. c. xcix	22 July 1848
An Act for constructing a Harbour at Leck Robie, and for maintaining the Harbour of Little Ferry, both in the County of Sutherland.
Chester Cemetery Act 1848	11 & 12 Vict. c. c	22 July 1848
An Act for establishing a general Cemetery for the Interment of the Dead in the Parish of Saint Mary on the Hill in the City of Chester.
Manchester Corporation Waterworks Amendment Act 1848	11 & 12 Vict. c. ci	22 July 1848
An Act to alter, amend, and enlarge the Powers and Provisions of "The Manchester Corporation Waterworks Act, 1847." (Note: Manchester Corporation Waterworks Act 1847 (10 & 11 Vict. c. cciii))
Leeds Improvement Amendment Act 1848 (repealed)	11 & 12 Vict. c. cii	22 July 1848
An Act to amend extend and enlarge the Powers of an Act passed in the Session of Parliament held in the Fifth and Sixth Years of the Reign of Her present Majesty, intituled "An Act for better lighting, cleansing, sewering, and improving the Borough of Leeds in the County of York; and to give to the Mayor, Aldermen, and Burgesses of the said Borough further and more effectual Powers for draining and sewering the said Borough." (Note: Leeds Improvement Act 1842 (5 & 6 Vict. c. civ)) (Repealed by West Yorkshire Act 1980 (c. xiv))
Galvanized Iron Company's Dissolution Act 1848	11 & 12 Vict. c. ciii	22 July 1848
An Act for dissolving and facilitating the Winding-up of the Affairs of "The Patent Galvanized Iron Company," trading under the Firm or Style of Malins & Rawlinsons.
Middle Level Drainage Amendment Act 1848	11 & 12 Vict. c. civ	22 July 1848
An Act to amend the Acts for improving the Drainage and Navigation of the Middle Level of the Fens, and for other Purposes connected therewith.
Low's Patent Copper Company Act 1848	11 & 12 Vict. c. cv	22 July 1848
An Act to enable Low's Patent Copper Company to work certain Letters Patent.
Scottish Provident Institution Act 1848 (repealed)	11 & 12 Vict. c. cvi	22 July 1848
An Act for incorporating the Scottish Provident Institution, for confirming the Laws and Regulations thereof, for enabling the said Society to sue and be sued, to take and to hold Property; and for other Purposes relating to said Society. (Repealed by Scottish Provident Institution Act 1927 (17 & 18 Geo. 5. c. xv))
Dublin and Mullingar Turnpike Road Act 1848 (repealed)	11 & 12 Vict. c. cvii	22 July 1848
An Act to amend and continue the Term of an Act passed in the Fifty-seventh Year of the Reign of His late Majesty King George the Third, intituled "An Act to continue the Term of an Act passed in the Parliament of Ireland in the Thirty-fifth Year of His present Majesty, (Note: Dublin and Mullingar Road Act 1795 (35 Geo. 3. c. 43 (I))) for improving and repairing the Turnpike Road leading from Dublin to Mullingar, and for repealing the several Laws heretofore made relating to the said Road." (Note: Dublin and Mullingar Turnpike Road Act 1817 (57 Geo. 3. c. 49)) (Repealed by Turnpike Trusts Abolition (Ireland) Act 1857 (20 & 21 Vict. c. 16))
Tadcaster and Halton Dial Turnpike Road Act 1848	11 & 12 Vict. c. cviii	22 July 1848
An Act for authorizing the Trustees of the Tadcaster and Halton Dial Turnpike Road to make a Diversion or Alteration of such Part of the Line of the Tadcaster and Halton Dial Turnpike Road as lies in the Parish of Tadcaster in the West Riding of the County of York.
Philanthropic Society's Act 1848 (repealed)	11 & 12 Vict. c. cix	22 July 1848
An Act to enable the President, Vice-Presidents, Treasurer, and Members of the Philanthropic Society to sell and grant Leases of the Lands belonging to them, and to purchase other Lands; and for other Purposes relating to the said Society. (Repealed by Statute Law (Repeals) Act 2013 (c. 2))
Orphan Working School Act 1848 (repealed)	11 & 12 Vict. c. cx	22 July 1848
An Act to incorporate the Members of the Institution called "The Orphan Working School," now established at Haverstock Hill, Hampstead Road, in the County of Middlesex, and to enable them the better to carry on their charitable Designs. (Repealed by Royal Alexandra and Albert School Act 1949 (12, 13 & 14 Geo. 6. c. xviii))
London and Blackwall Railway Amendment Act 1848	11 & 12 Vict. c. cxi	25 July 1848
An Act to alter and amend some of the Provisions of the Acts relating to the London and Blackwall Railway Company.
Edinburgh and Northern Railway (Roscobie, Keltyhead and Glencraig Branches, &c.) Act 1848	11 & 12 Vict. c. cxii	25 July 1848
An Act to enable the Edinburgh and Northern Railway Company to make Branch Railways to Roscobie, Keltyhead, and Glencraig; and for certain other Purposes.
Edinburgh Police Act 1848 (repealed)	11 & 12 Vict. c. cxiii	14 August 1848
An Act for more effectually watching, cleansing, and lighting the Streets of the City of Edinburgh and adjoining Districts, for regulating the Police thereof, and for other Purposes relating thereto. (Repealed by Edinburgh Municipal and Police Act 1879 (42 & 43 Vict. c. cxxxii))
Great Northern Railway Amendment and Isle of Axholme Extension Act 1848	11 & 12 Vict. c. cxiv	14 August 1848
An Act to amend the Acts relating to the Great Northern Railway Company; and to enable the Company to make an Extension of their Railway from the Parish of Saundby in Nottinghamshire to the Askern Branch of the Wakefield, Pontefract, and Goole Railway in the Parish of Owston in the West Riding of Yorkshire, with a Branch to rejoin the Great Northern Railway in the Parish of Snaith in the said West Riding.
Lancashire and Yorkshire Railway Act 1848	11 & 12 Vict. c. cxv	14 August 1848
An Act for enabling the Lancashire and Yorkshire Railway Company to make certain Modifications of their Share Capital; and for other Purposes.
Edinburgh and Bathgate Railway (Extension and Deviation) Act 1848	11 & 12 Vict. c. cxvi	14 August 1848
An Act to enable the Edinburgh and Bathgate Railway Company to extend their Whitburn Branch, and to alter or deviate their Uphall and Binnie Branch.
Londonderry and Coleraine Railway (Amendment and Deviation) Act 1848 (repealed)	11 & 12 Vict. c. cxvii	14 August 1848
An Act to authorize a Deviation in the Line of the Londonderry and Coleraine Railway, and to amend the Act (Note: Londonderry and Coleraine Railway Act 1845 (8 & 9 Vict. c. clxxxvii)) relating thereto. (Repealed by Londonderry and Coleraine Railway Consolidation Act 1852 (15 & 16 Vict. c. xliii))
Edinburgh and Glasgow Railway Amendment (No. 2) Act 1848	11 & 12 Vict. c. cxviii	14 August 1848
An Act to facilitate the Construction of the Cowlairs Branch of the Glasgow, Airdrie, and Monklands Junction Railway by the Edinburgh and Glasgow Railway Company, and to grant further Powers to that Company.
Royston and Hitchin Railway Amendment (Shepreth Extension) Act 1848	11 & 12 Vict. c. cxix	14 August 1848
An Act to enable the Royston and Hitchin Railway Company to extend their Line of Railway from Royston to Shepreth. and to make a Deviation of the authorized Line at Hitchin.
Newport and Pontypool Railway Amendment Act 1848	11 & 12 Vict. c. cxx	14 August 1848
An Act to amend the Provisions of the Newport and Pontypool Railway Act, 1845. (Note: Newport and Pontypool Railway Act 1845 (8 & 9 Vict. c. clxix))
Caledonian Railway (Glasgow Station) Act 1848	11 & 12 Vict. c. cxxi	14 August 1848
An Act to enable the Caledonian Railway Company to extend their Railway across the River Clyde at Glasgow, and to form a Station in that City.
Dunbar Burgh and Harbour Act 1848	11 & 12 Vict. c. cxxii	14 August 1848
An Act for the Amendment and Continuation of the Burgh Customs, and Water, Shore, and Harbour Rates, of the Burgh of Dunbar, and for other Purposes connected with the said Burgh, and the Supply of Water to the same, and the Harbour thereof.
Leith Municipal and Police Act 1848 (repealed)	11 & 12 Vict. c. cxxiii	14 August 1848
An Act to provide for the Municipal and Police Government of the Burgh of Leith, and for other Purposes relating thereto. (Repealed by Edinburgh Corporation Order Confirmation Act 1933 (24 & 25 Geo. 5. c. v))
Grand Canal Company Act 1848	11 & 12 Vict. c. cxxiv	14 August 1848
An Act for the better carrying on the Affairs of the Grand Canal Company.
London and South Western Railway Amendment Act 1848	11 & 12 Vict. c. cxxv	14 August 1848
An Act for enabling the London and South-Western Railway Company to effect certain Extensions and Deviations at Godalming, Cosham, London Bridge, Southampton, and Poole, and certain Arrangements respecting Steam Packets; and for other Purposes.
Furness Railway Amendment Act 1848 (repealed)	11 & 12 Vict. c. cxxvi	14 August 1848
An Act to enable the Furness Railway Company to raise a further Sum of Money, and to purchase Steam Vessels, and for the Amendment of the Acts relating to the said Company. (Repealed by Furness Railway Act 1855 (18 & 19 Vict. c. clxxiii))
Stirling and Dunfermline Railway (Amendment and Deviations) Act 1848	11 & 12 Vict. c. cxxvii	14 August 1848
An Act to authorize certain Deviations in the Main Line of the Stirling and Dunfermline Railway, and for other Purposes.
Whitehaven and Furness Junction Railway Amendment Act 1848	11 & 12 Vict. c. cxxviii	14 August 1848
An Act to enable the Whitehaven and Furness Junction Railway Company to deviate or extend their Line of Railway from Silecroft to Foxfield, and to abandon a Portion of their Line between Silecroft and Ireleth; to make Branches to Whitehaven Harbour; and for other Purposes.
Dundee and Arbroath Railway (Dundee Junction) Act 1848	11 & 12 Vict. c. cxxix	14 August 1848
An Act to enable the Dundee and Arbroath Railway Company to make a Junction Line of Railway into the Royal Burgh of Dundee.
London and North Western Railway Branches Act 1848	11 & 12 Vict. c. cxxx	14 August 1848
An Act for enabling the London and North-Western Railway Company to make a Branch Railway from the Coventry and Nuneaton Line, in the Parish of Exhall, to the Craven Colliery; and another Branch Railway from the same Coventry and Nuneaton Line at Bedworth to the Mount Pleasant Colliery; to construct a new Approach Road to the Station of the London and North-Western Railway at Tamworth; and to enlarge the Rugby Station of the last-mentioned Railway, all in the County of Warwick; and for other Purposes.
Midland Railway Act 1848	11 & 12 Vict. c. cxxxi	14 August 1848
An Act to enable the Midland Railway Company to construct a Railway from Gloucester to Stonehouse, and for other Purposes connected with the Bristol and Gloucester Line of the Midland Railway.
Newry and Enniskillen Railway Amendment Act 1848 (repealed)	11 & 12 Vict. c. cxxxii	14 August 1848
An Act to alter and amend the Acts relating to the Newry and Enniskillen Railway Company, and to enable them to make Arrangements with other Railway Companies. (Repealed by Newry and Enniskillen Railway Amendment and Extension Act 1857 (20 & 21 Vict. c. clvi))
Oxford, Worcester and Wolverhampton Railway (Deviation) Act 1848	11 & 12 Vict. c. cxxxiii	14 August 1848
An Act to authorize an Alteration of the Line of the Oxford, Worcester, and Wolverhampton Railway; and for other Purposes.
Monkland Railways Act 1848	11 & 12 Vict. c. cxxxiv	14 August 1848
An Act to amalgamate the Monkland and Kirkintilloch, Ballochney, and Slamannan Railways.
Great Western Railway (Slough and Windsor) Act 1848	11 & 12 Vict. c. cxxxv	14 August 1848
An Act for making a Railway from the Great Western Railway near Slough to the Town of New Windsor in the County of Berks.
London, Brighton and South Coast Railway Act 1848	11 & 12 Vict. c. cxxxvi	14 August 1848
An Act for making an Alteration in the New Cross Station; and for amending the Powers and Provisions of the several Acts relating to the London, Brighton, and South Coast Railway.
Worcester Turnpike Roads Amendment Act 1848	11 & 12 Vict. c. cxxxvii	14 August 1848
An Act to enable the Trustees of the Worcester Turnpike Road to make certain new Roads, and to improve and more effectually maintain the several Roads leading into and from the City of Worcester.
Aberavon Market Act 1848 (repealed)	11 & 12 Vict. c. cxxxviii	14 August 1848
An Act for establishing a Market and Fair in the Borough of Avon otherwise Aberavon in the County of Glamorgan. (Repealed by Port Talbot Corporation Act 1972 (c. xlix))
New Ross Port and Harbour Act 1848 (repealed)	11 & 12 Vict. c. cxxxix	14 August 1848
An Act for the better regulating and improving the Port and Harbour of New Ross in the Counties of Wexford and Kilkenny. (Repealed by New Ross Port and Harbour Amendment Act 1861 (24 & 25 Vict. c. cxl))
Huddersfield Improvement Act 1848 or the Huddersfield Amendment Act 1848 (repealed)	11 & 12 Vict. c. cxl	14 August 1848
An Act for better paving, lighting, watching, sewering, draining, cleansing, and otherwise improving the Town and Neighbourhood of Huddersfield in the West Riding of the County of York, for maintaining an efficient Police, and removing and preventing Nuisances and Annoyances therein. (Repealed by Huddersfield Improvement Act 1871 (34 & 35 Vict. c. cli))
Londonderry Improvement Act 1848	11 & 12 Vict. c. cxli	14 August 1848
An Act for the Improvement of the Borough of Londonderry.
Landowners West of England and South Wales Land Drainage and Inclosure Companies Act 1848	11 & 12 Vict. c. cxlii	14 August 1848
An Act for incorporating "The West of England and South Wales Land Draining Company;" and for enabling Owners of limited Interests in Land to charge the same for the Purposes of Drainage, Irrigation, Warping, Embankment, Reclamation, Inclosure, and Improvement.
Nene and Wisbech Rivers Improvement Act 1848	11 & 12 Vict. c. cxliii	14 August 1848
An Act to improve the River Nene and Wisbech River, and the Drainage of Lands discharging their Waters into the same.
Birkenhead Docks Act 1848 (repealed)	11 & 12 Vict. c. cxliv	14 August 1848
An Act to alter and amend the several Acts relating to the Birkenhead Commissioners Docks, and to transfer the several Powers of the said Commissioners to a Corporate Body to be entitled "The Trustees of the Birkenhead Docks;" and for other Purposes. (Repealed by Mersey Dock Acts Consolidation Act 1858 (21 & 22 Vict. c. xcii))
Hulme and Eccles Turnpike Road Act 1848 (repealed)	11 & 12 Vict. c. cxlv	14 August 1848
An Act for continuing the Term of an Act passed in the Eighth Year of the Reign of His Majesty King George the Fourth, intituled "An Act for more effectually repairing and maintaining the Road from Hulme, across the River Irwell, through Salford, to Eccles, in the County Palatine of Lancaster, and a Branch of Road communicating therewith," (Note: Road through Salford and Eccles Act 1827 (7 & 8 Geo. 4. c. ix)) so far as relates to the Road from Hulme to Eccles, for the Purposes of enabling the Trustees to pay off the Debt now due on the said Roads. (Repealed by Annual Turnpike Acts Continuance Act 1867 (30 & 31 Vict. c. 121))
Crossford Bridge and Manchester Road Act 1848 (repealed)	11 & 12 Vict. c. cxlvi	14 August 1848
An Act for altering and amending an Act (Note: Road from Crossford Bridge to Manchester Act 1831 (1 Will. 4. c. vii)) passed for maintaining the Road from Crossford Bridge to Manchester, and a Branch connected therewith. (Repealed by Annual Turnpike Acts Continuance Act 1870 (33 & 34 Vict. c. 73))
Richmond (Yorkshire) to Reeth Road Act 1848	11 & 12 Vict. c. cxlvii	14 August 1848
An Act for more effectually repairing and maintaining the Road from Richmond to Reeth in the County of York.
Wishaw and Coltness Railway Act 1848	11 & 12 Vict. c. cxlviii	14 August 1848
An Act to enable the Wishaw and Coltness Railway Company to divert and improve certain Portions of their Line.
Timber Preserving Company's Extension Act 1848	11 & 12 Vict. c. cxlix	14 August 1848
An Act to enable "The Timber Preserving Company" to purchase and work certain Letters Patent, and for confirming the same.
Thorne Moor Drainage and Improvement Act 1848	11 & 12 Vict. c. cl	14 August 1848
An Act for draining, warping, and otherwise improving Thorne Moor in the West Riding of Yorkshire.
Chapel for Marlborough College Act 1848	11 & 12 Vict. c. cli	14 August 1848
An Act to authorize the Endowment and Consecration of a new Chapel at Marlborough, and the Annexation of the same to Marlborough College.
London (City) Small Debts Act 1848 (repealed)	11 & 12 Vict. c. clii	31 August 1848
An Act to amend the Act (Note: London (City) Small Debts Act 1847 (10 & 11 Vict. c. lxxi)) for the more easy Recovery of Small Debts and Demands within the City of London and the Liberties thereof. (Repealed by London (City) Small Debts Extension Act 1852 (15 & 16 Vict. c. lxxvii))
Farmers Estate Society (Ireland) Act 1848	11 & 12 Vict. c. cliii	31 August 1848
An Act for the Establishment of the "Farmers Estate Society of Ireland."
Dundee and Arbroath Railway Lease Act 1848	11 & 12 Vict. c. cliv	31 August 1848
An Act to enable the Dundee and Perth Railway Company to take a Lease of the Undertaking of the Dundee and Arbroath Railway Company, and to amend the Acts relating to such Companies respectively.
Paisley, Barrhead and Hurlet Railway Act 1848	11 & 12 Vict. c. clv	31 August 1848
An Act for making a Railway from Paisley to Barrhead, with certain Branch Railways therewith connected, to be called "The Paisley, Barrhead, and Hurlet Railway."
Manchester, Buxton, Matlock and Midlands Junction Railway Act 1848	11 & 12 Vict. c. clvi	31 August 1848
An Act to make a Deviation in the authorized Line of the Manchester, Buxton, Matlock, and Midlands Junction Railway, together with a Branch to Bakewell.
Exeter and Exmouth Railway Act 1848	11 & 12 Vict. c. clvii	31 August 1848
An Act to amend the Acts relating to the Exeter and Exmouth Railway Company.
Great Western Railway (Leamington Line) Act 1848	11 & 12 Vict. c. clviii	31 August 1848
An Act to enable the Great Western Railway Company to construct a Loop Line from the Birmingham and Oxford Junction Railway through the Town of Leamington; and for other Purposes.
Great Western Railway Act 1848	11 & 12 Vict. c. clix	31 August 1848
An Act to confer additional Powers on the Great Western Railway Company with reference to an Agreement of the Twelfth of November 1846, for the Purchase by them of the Birmingham and Oxford Junction and Birmingham, Wolverhampton, and Dudley Railways.
Edinburgh and Glasgow and Edinburgh and Bathgate Railway Companies Amendment Act 1848	11 & 12 Vict. c. clx	31 August 1848
An Act to enable the Edinburgh and Glasgow Railway Company to hold Shares in the Edinburgh and Bathgate Railway Company; and for other Purposes.
Walsall Improvement and Market Act 1848 (repealed)	11 & 12 Vict. c. clxi	31 August 1848
An Act for the more effectually paving, lighting, watching, draining, cleansing, and otherwise improving the Town and Neighbourhood of Walsall in the County of Stafford, for improving the Markets, and for the better assessing the Poor's Rates, Highway Rates, Church Rates, and other Local Rates within the Parish of Walsall in the said County. (Repealed by Walsall Corporation Act 1969 (c. lviii))
Clerkenwell Improvement Act 1848	11 & 12 Vict. c. clxii	31 August 1848
An Act for granting further Powers to the Clerkenwell Improvement Commissioners for the Purpose of enabling them to complete the new Street and the Improvements connected therewith.
City of London Sewers Act 1848	11 & 12 Vict. c. clxiii	5 September 1848
An Act to provide for the Sanitary Improvement of the City of London and the Liberties thereof, and for the better cleansing, sewering, paving, and lighting the same.

=== Private acts ===
Short title	Citation	Royal assent
Long title
Govan (Lanarkshire) Glebe Lands Act 1848	11 & 12 Vict. c. 1 Pr.	9 June 1848
An Act to authorize the feuing of the Glebe Lands of the Parish of Govan in the County of Lanark.
Hamlyn's Estate Act 1848	11 & 12 Vict. c. 2 Pr.	30 June 1848
An Act for authorizing the Trustees of the Will of the late Calmady Pollexfen Hamlyn Esquire, under the Direction of the Court of Chancery, to pull down the Mansion or Dwelling House at Paschoe in the County of Devon, Part of the Estates devised by the said Will, and to rebuild the same, and to raise Money for those Purposes by Mortgage of the said Estates; and for making Provision for the Payment of the Principal Monies so raised; and for other Purposes.
Bishop's Hull (Somerset) Curacy Estate Act 1848	11 & 12 Vict. c. 3 Pr.	22 July 1848
An Act for confirming an Exchange of certain Lands in the Parish of Wilton in the County of Somerset, heretofore Part of the Augmentation of the Perpetual Curacy of Hill Bishops otherwise Bishops Hull in the same County for certain Lands in the Parish of Staplegrove in the same County, and for other Purposes.
Hale's Estate Act 1848	11 & 12 Vict. c. 4 Pr.	22 July 1848
An Act to authorize the Sale to the Right Honourable George Harry Earl of Stamford and Warrington of certain Freehold and Leasehold Hereditaments in the County Salop devised by the Will of Polly Hale Widow, deceased, and for directing the Investment of the Purchase-Money in other Hereditaments, to be settled in like Manner.
Newton's Estate Act 1848	11 & 12 Vict. c. 5 Pr.	14 August 1848
An Act to authorize Grants in Fee and Leases for long Terms of Years, for Building Purposes, of the devised Estate of John Newton Esquire, deceased, situate at Gorton in the Parish of Manchester in the County of Lancaster.
Fullerton's Estate Act 1848	11 & 12 Vict. c. 6 Pr.	14 August 1848
An Act for enabling Sales, Leases, and Mortgages to be made of certain Estates in the County of York, heretofore belonging to John Fullerton.
Jessop's Estate Act 1848	11 & 12 Vict. c. 7 Pr.	14 August 1848
An Act to enable the Trustees of the Will of Edward Jessop the elder to sell the Estates devised by such Will, and to lay out the Money to arise therefrom in the Purchase of other Estates under the Direction of the Court of Chancery.
Hudson's Estate Act 1848	11 & 12 Vict. c. 8 Pr.	14 August 1848
An Act for enabling Leases and Sales to be made of an Estate at Horton in the Parish of Bradford in the County of York holden upon the Trusts of the Will of Jacob Hudson deceased.
Miller's Estate Act 1848	11 & 12 Vict. c. 9 Pr.	14 August 1848
An Act to enable Sir William Miller of Glenlee and Barskimming, Baronet, Heir of Entail in Possession of the Lands and Estates of Glenlee, Barskimming, and others, lying in the Stewartry of Kirkcudbright and County of Ayr, to exchange certain Portions of the said Estates, and to sell certain Parts thereof, for the Payment and Extinction of the Debts, Obligations, and Burdens affecting the same.
United Charities of Nathaniel Waterhouse (Halifax) Act 1848	11 & 12 Vict. c. 10 Pr.	14 August 1848
An Act for incorporating the Governors and Trustees of the united Charities of Nathaniel Waterhouse, appointed by virtue of An Act passed in the Seventeenth Year of the Reign of King George the Third, intituled "An Act for uniting and better regulating the Charities of Nathaniel Waterhouse within the Town and Parish of Halifax in the West Riding of the County of York;" (Note: United Charities of Nathaniel Waterhouse (Halifax) Act 1777 (17 Geo. 3. c. 87 Pr.)) and amending the Powers and Provisions of the said Act, and granting other Powers and Provisions enabling the Governors and Trustees of the said united Charities, when incorporated, to sell and to convey Parts of the Lands of the Charity Estates, make Exchanges of the Lands of the said Estates for other Lands, lease Mines, fell Timber, and effect Improvements; and for regulating the Application of the Revenues, Rents, and Income of the said Estates, and enlarging the charitable Uses of the said Charities; and for other Purposes concerning the same.
Sandbach (Cheshire) Charities Act 1848	11 & 12 Vict. c. 11 Pr.	31 August 1848
An Act to provide for the better Administration of certain Charities in the Parish of Sandbach in the County of Chester, and the Distribution of the Income thereof, and for vesting the Estates and Property belonging to the Charities in new Trustees, and to enable the Trustees to grant Leases of the Charity Estates; and for other Purposes.
Duke of Bridgewater's Estate Act 1848	11 & 12 Vict. c. 12 Pr.	31 August 1848
An Act to alter and amend an Act passed in the Eighth and Ninth Years of the Reign of Her present Majesty, (Note: Duke of Bridgewater's Estate Act 1845 (8 & 9 Vict. c. 29 Pr.)) for enabling the Trustees of the Will of Francis late Duke of Bridgewater to carry into execution certain Articles of Agreement entered into by them with the Right Honourable Francis Egerton now Earl of Ellesmere.
Woolwich (Kent) Rectory Act 1848	11 & 12 Vict. c. 13 Pr.	31 August 1848
An Act for the Sale of the Glebe Lands belonging to the Rectory of Woolwich, and the Parish Church of Saint Mary Woolwich in the County of Kent, and to confirm the Building Leases of such Lands, and for Endowment of a new Ecclesiastical District; and for other Purposes.
Ramsden Estate Act 1848 (repealed)	11 & 12 Vict. c. 14 Pr.	31 August 1848
An Act for extending certain Powers of an Act passed in the Eighth Year of the Reign of Her present Majesty, intituled "An Act for enlarging the Powers contained in the Will of Sir John Ramsden Baronet, deceased, to grant Leases of the Hereditaments in the Townships of Huddersfield, Honley, Dalton, and Almondbury, devised by such Will, and for other Purposes," (Note: Ramsden Estate Act 1844 (7 & 8 Vict. c. 21 Pr.)) to the Hereditaments in the Parishes of Almondbury, Kirkheaton, and Huddersfield comprised in the Settlement made on the Marriage of John Charles Ramsden Esquire, deceased; and for other purposes. (Repealed by Ramsden Estate Act 1867 (30 & 31 Vict. c. 2 Pr.))
Charles Blundell's Estate Act 1848	11 & 12 Vict. c. 15 Pr.	31 August 1848
An Act to authorize the granting of Building Leases for Ninety-nine Years of Parts of the Trust Estates of the Will of the late Charles Robert Blundell Esquire, situate in the Parishes of Sefton, Walton on the Hill, and North Meols in the County of Lancaster, and to lease Waste Lands and Coal and other Mines, and to exchange certain detached and intermixed Lands, other Parts of the said Trust Estates.
Earl of Sheffield's Estate Act 1848	11 & 12 Vict. c. 16 Pr.	31 August 1848
An Act for granting Building and other Improvement Leases of the Settled Estates of the Right Honourable George Augustus Frederick Charles Earl of Sheffield, situate in the Parishes of Newhaven and Bishopstone in the County of Sussex.
Londonderry and Seaham Settlement Act 1848	11 & 12 Vict. c. 17 Pr.	31 August 1848
An Act to amend a Settlement made by the Most Honourable the Marquess and Marchioness of Londonderry and the Honourable Viscount Seaham; and for other Purposes therein mentioned.
Marquess of Antrim's Estate Act 1848	11 & 12 Vict. c. 18 Pr.	31 August 1848
An Act for compromising certain Suits and Claims affecting Parts of the Estates of the late Marquess of Antrim, and for settling certain Lands intermixed with Parts of such Estates.
Fawcett's (or Alderson's) Estate Act 1848	11 & 12 Vict. c. 19 Pr.	31 August 1848
An Act for vesting the Two undivided Sixth Shares of Christopher Alderson a Lunatic, and Mary Alderson Spinster, a Person of unsound Mind, as Two of the Six Children of Christopher Alderson Alderson deceased, in certain Freehold Estates in the Counties of Middlesex, Hertford, and York, in Trustees, in whom the other Four undivided Sixth Shares are now vested, upon Trust for Sale.
Marquess of Bute's Estate Act 1848	11 & 12 Vict. c. 20 Pr.	31 August 1848
An Act to alter and amend certain Powers of leasing contained in the last Will and Testament of the late Most Honourable John Crichton Stuart Marquess of Bute and Earl of Dumfries deceased.
St. Mary's Hospital (Newcastle-upon-Tyne) Act 1848 (repealed)	11 & 12 Vict. c. 21 Pr.	31 August 1848
An Act for altering an Act made and passed in the Session of Parliament held in the Ninth and Tenth Years of the Reign of Her present Majesty Queen Victoria, (Note: Virgin Mary's Hospital (Newcastle-upon-Tyne) Estate Act 1846 (9 & 10 Vict. c. 42 Pr.)) for enabling the Master and Brethren of the Hospital of Saint Mary the Virgin within the Borough of Newcastle-upon-Tyne to grant Leases of their Estates; and for other Purposes. (Repealed by Saint Mary's Hospital (Newcastle-upon-Tyne) Act 1888 (51 & 52 Vict. c. cvii))
Glengall's Estates Act 1848	11 & 12 Vict. c. 22 Pr.	4 September 1848
An Act for the Relief of the Right Honourable Richard Earl of Glengall, in respect of his Estates in the Counties of Waterford and Tipperary in Ireland, and for vesting the same Estates in Trustees for effecting such Relief.
Maxwell's Restitution Act 1848 (Note: This act was not printed by the Queen's Printer.)	11 & 12 Vict. c. 23 Pr.	9 June 1848
An Act for the Restitution in Blood of William Maxwell Esquire.
Heneage's Divorce Act 1848	11 & 12 Vict. c. 24 Pr.	9 June 1848
An Act to dissolve the Marriage of Edward Heneage Esquire with Charlotte Frances Ann Heneage his now Wife, and to enable him to marry again; and for other Purposes.
Nicholson's Divorce Act 1848	11 & 12 Vict. c. 25 Pr.	14 August 1848
An Act to dissolve the Marriage of Robert Nicholson Esquire with Frances Nicholson his now Wife, and to enable him to marry again; and for other Purposes therein mentioned.
Lugard's Divorce Act 1848	11 & 12 Vict. c. 26 Pr.	31 August 1848
An Act to dissolve the Marriage of the Reverend Frederick Grueber Lugard Clerk with Grace Price Lugard his now Wife, and to enable him to marry again; and for other Purposes.
Jervis's Divorce Act 1848	11 & 12 Vict. c. 27 Pr.	31 August 1848
An Act to dissolve the Marriage of William Jervis, a Captain in the Forty-second Regiment of Bengal Native Infantry, and Paymaster and Superintendent of Native Pensioners at Barrackpore in the Province of Bengal in the East Indies, with Mary Amelia his now Wife, and to enable him to marry again; and for other Purposes therein mentioned.

=== Sources ===
- A Collection of the Public General Statutes Passed in the Eleventh and Twelfth Years of the Reign of Her Majesty Queen Victoria, 1847-8. London: Eyre & Spottiswoode. 1848 – via Internet Archive.
- A Collection of the Public General Statutes Passed in the Eleventh and Twelfth Years of the Reign of Her Majesty Queen Victoria. London: Eyre & Spottiswoode. 1848 – via Google Books.
- A Compendious Abstract of the Public General Acts of the United Kingdom of Great Britain and Ireland. E. B. Ince – via Google Books.

== See also ==
- List of acts of the Parliament of the United Kingdom
