= Millbank Prison Act 1843 =

Act of the Parliament of the United Kingdom

- Act of Parliament
- Parliament of the United Kingdom
- Long title: An Act for regulating the Prison at Millbank.
- Citation: 6 & 7 Vict. c. 26
- Territorial extent: United Kingdom

Dates
- Royal assent: 27 June 1843
- Commencement: 27 June 1843 (Note: The Acts of Parliament (Commencement) Act 1793.)
- Repealed: 29 March 1892

Other legislation
- Amends: See § Repealed enactments
- Repeals/revokes: See § Repealed enactments
- Amended by: Millbank Prison Act 1848; Convict Prisons Act 1850; Millbank Prison Act 1869; Criminal Lunatics Act 1884
- Repealed by: Millbank Prison Act 1892

Status: Repealed

Text of statute as originally enacted

The Millbank Prison Act 1843 (6 & 7 Vict. c. 26) was an act of the Parliament of the United Kingdom that repealed the earlier acts establishing and regulating the Penitentiary House at Millbank, renamed it the Millbank Prison, and made new provision for its management, discipline and staffing.

== Provisions ==
=== Repealed enactments ===
Section 1 of the act repealed 12 enactments, listed in that section, and so much of any other act then in force as related to the Penitentiary House at Millbank. The repeal did not extend to any of the repealed acts so far as they repealed the whole or part of any other act, and did not affect any offence committed, any privilege or protection acquired, any rule or thing done, any contract or agreement made, or the term of confinement of any convict already received into the Penitentiary House, before the passing of the act, under any of the repealed acts.

Citation	Short title	Description	Extent of repeal
34 Geo. 3. c. 84	Penitentiary for Convicts Act 1794	An Act for erecting a Penitentiary House or Houses for confining and employing Convicts.	The whole act.
52 Geo. 3. c. 44	Penitentiary House, etc. Act 1812	An Act for the Erection of a Penitentiary House for the Confinement of Offenders convicted within the City of London and County of Middlesex; and for making Compensation to Jeremy Bentham Esquire for the Nonperformance of an Agreement between the said Jeremy Bentham and the Lords Commissioners of His Majesty's Treasury respecting the Custody and Maintenance of Convicts.	The whole act.
56 Geo. 3. c. 63	Millbank Penitentiary Act 1816	An Act to regulate the General Penitentiary for Convicts at Millbank in the County of Middlesex.	The whole act.
59 Geo. 3. c. 136	Millbank Penitentiary Act 1819	An Act for the better Regulation of the General Penitentiary for Convicts at Millbank.	The whole act.
7 & 8 Geo. 4. c. 33	Millbank Penitentiary Act 1827	An Act for the further Regulation of the General Penitentiary at Millbank.	The whole act.
4 & 5 Will. 4. c. 36	Central Criminal Court Act 1834	An Act for establishing a new Court for the Trial of Offences committed in the Metropolis and Parts adjoining.	Sections 5 to 8, so far as they relate to the said Penitentiary House.
5 & 6 Will. 4. c. 38	Prisons Act 1835	An Act for effecting greater Uniformity of Practice in the Government of the several Prisons in England and Wales, and for appointing Inspectors of Prisons in Great Britain.	Sections 13 to 15, so far as they relate to the said Penitentiary House.
7 Will. 4 & 1 Vict. c. 13	Millbank Penitentiary Act 1837	An Act to amend the Acts for regulating the General Penitentiary at Millbank.	The whole act.
2 & 3 Vict. c. 56	Prisons Act 1839	An Act for the better ordering of Prisons.	Part of section 1, and sections 18 to 21, so far as they relate to the said Penitentiary House.
5 & 6 Vict. c. 98	Prisons Act 1842	An Act to amend the Laws concerning Prisons.	Sections 26 and 27, so far as they relate to the said Penitentiary House.
6 & 7 Vict. c. 3	Mutiny Act 1843	An Act for punishing Mutiny and Desertion, and for the better Payment of the Army and their Quarters.	So much as relates to the said Penitentiary House.
6 & 7 Vict. c. 4	Marine Mutiny Act 1843	An Act for the Regulation of Her Majesty's Royal Marine Forces while on shore.	So much as relates to the said Penitentiary House.

== Subsequent developments ==
The act was amended by the Millbank Prison Act 1848 (11 & 12 Vict. c. 104), and, so far as it related to the Millbank Prison, by the Convict Prisons Act 1850 (13 & 14 Vict. c. 39) and the Millbank Prison Act 1869 (32 & 33 Vict. c. 95).

The whole act was repealed by section 1(2) of, and the schedule to, the Millbank Prison Act 1892 (55 & 56 Vict. c. 1), which came into force on 29 March 1892.
