= Alexander Copland Hutchison =

British surgeon and medical author

Alexander Copland (or Copeland) Hutchison FRSE (1786–1840) was a British surgeon and medical author remembered for his book Practical Observations in Surgery (1811).

In 1818 he made an interesting observation that navy personnel suffered exceptionally low levels of kidney stones (Urinary calculi) totalling eight cases over a 15-year period (1800–1815) within a minimum of 145,000 subjects per year. Taking all factors into account he calculated a total rate of approximately 1 in 11,000. Whilst the data was clear the cause was not. It was largely ascribed to the very high proportion of salt beef and pork within the diet, and the rather unattractive issue of sleeping in one’s own sweat within your hammock. Oddly, the study seemed to believe that naval diet destroyed the inevitability of kidney stones, rather than considering that naval diet excluded the causes of kidney stones (being very low in dairy products).

== Life ==
Hutchison was born in Stonehouse in Devonshire around 1786 into a naval family.

He studied medicine at Aberdeen University, gaining his doctorate (MD) in 1809. His employment was thereafter in various government roles, his first being Surgeon to HM Dockyard in Sheerness. In 1817 he moved to London where he ran the Westminster Dispensary whilst also acting as Medical Supervisor for Millbank Prison. Under his period of care an extreme epidemic broke out in the prison in 1822/23. The investigation, led by Henry Grey Bennet, demonstrated that the issues arose from the swampy location of the prison and general poor diet and living conditions. Although no blame was apportioned to Dr Hutchison, modern-day interpretation would certainly criticise his restriction on diet, stating that prisoners "had too much food". That said, the allowance was 4 oz of raw meat per day and 8 oz on Sundays, together with 1 lb of potatoes. The previous allowance before his arrival was 76 ounces of meat per week per couple, roughly 15% more.

In 1827 he was elected a Fellow of the Royal Society of Edinburgh his proposer being Sir George Ballingall. He was elected a Fellow of the Royal Society of London in the following year.

In the 1830s he became Consulting Surgeon at the Royal Metropolitan Infirmary of Children’s Illnesses (later evolving into Great Ormond Street Hospital). In October 1838 a case appears in the Old Bailey Law Courts in London, of a servant, Millicent Ablethorp, stealing money from Hutchison whilst in his employ as a cook. This appears to have been conducted by Millicent having been given money to pay food bills but not paying them and accumulating the monies, before suddenly disappearing. She was found guilty and sentenced to seven years transportation. She appears on the convicts lists in May 1839 on HMS Hindostan heading for Van Diemens Land (Tasmania). Records show her as 30 years old with red hair, and very short (4’10’’ – 147 cm).

He died at his home 83 Wimpole Street off Cavendish Square in London on 3 January 1840. His will is held at The National Archives in Kew.

== Publications ==
- Practical Observations in Surgery (1811)
- On the Comparative Infrequency of Urinary calculi among Seafaring People (1818)

== Family ==
His wife was Susannah Hutchison. They had a son in 1808 whilst living at Deal,
