= Millbank Prison Act 1892 =

Act of the Parliament of the United Kingdom

Millbank Prison Act 1892 (Note: Section 2.)
- Act of Parliament
- Parliament of the United Kingdom
- Long title: An Act to transfer the site of Millbank Prison to the management of the Commissioners of Works.
- Citation: 55 & 56 Vict. c. 1
- Territorial extent: United Kingdom

Dates
- Royal assent: 29 March 1892
- Commencement: 29 March 1892 (Note: The Acts of Parliament (Commencement) Act 1793.)
Other legislation
Repeals/revokes	See § Repealed enactments
Amended by	Statute Law Revision Act 1908

Status: Partially repealed

Text of statute as originally enacted

The Millbank Prison Act 1892 (55 & 56 Vict. c. 1) is an act of the Parliament of the United Kingdom that transferred the site of Millbank Prison to the management of the Commissioners of Works, following the prison's closure two years earlier.

== Provisions ==
=== Repealed enactments ===
Section 1(2) of the act repealed 4 enactments, listed in the schedule to the act.

Citation	Short title	Description	Extent of repeal
6 & 7 Vict. c. 26	Millbank Prison Act 1843	An Act for regulating the Prison at Millbank.	The whole act.
11 & 12 Vict. c. 104	Millbank Prison Act 1848	An Act for amending the Act for regulating the Prison at Millbank.	The whole act.
13 & 14 Vict. c. 39	Convict Prisons Act 1850	An Act for the better Government of Convict Prisons.	The whole act so far as it relates to Millbank Prison.
32 & 33 Vict. c. 95	Millbank Prison Act 1869	The Millbank Prison Act, 1869.	The whole act.

== Subsequent developments ==
The preamble, section 1(2), and the schedule to the act were repealed by section 1 of, and the schedule to, the Statute Law Revision Act 1908 (8 Edw. 7. c. 49), which came into force on 21 December 1908.
