= Penitentiary House, etc. Act 1812 =

Act of the Parliament of the United Kingdom

- Act of Parliament
- Parliament of the United Kingdom
- Long title: An Act for the Erection of a Penitentiary House for the Confinement of Offenders convicted within the City of London and County of Middlesex; and for making Compensation to Jeremy Bentham Esquire , for the Non-performance of an Agreement between the said Jeremy Bentham and the Lords Commissioners of His Majesty's Treasury, respecting the Custody and Maintenance of Convicts.
- Citation: 52 Geo. 3. c. 44
- Territorial extent: United Kingdom

Dates
- Royal assent: 20 April 1812
- Commencement: 20 April 1812 (Note: The Acts of Parliament (Commencement) Act 1793.)
- Repealed: 5 August 1873
Other legislation
Amended by	Millbank Penitentiary Act 1816
Repealed by	Statute Law Revision Act 1873
Relates to	Penitentiary Act 1779; Penitentiary for Convicts Act 1794

Status: Repealed

Text of statute as originally enacted

The Penitentiary House, etc. Act 1812 (52 Geo. 3. c. 44) was an act of the Parliament of the United Kingdom, granted royal assent on 20 April 1812.

It built on the Penitentiary Act 1779 (19 Geo. 3. c. 74) and Penitentiary for Convicts Act 1794 (34 Geo. 3. c. 84), making arrangements to build Millbank prison on a site bought from the Marquis of Salisbury and since 1794 vested in Jeremy Bentham. His plan to build a panopticon of his own design on the site had stalled, though the 1812 act compensated him for the money he had invested in the scheme.

The new prison was to serve Middlesex and the City of London, specifically those in those two areas who had been convicted of offences liable to penal transportation or of capital crimes - rather than be executed, the act required the latter to be imprisoned for life at Millbank. The act set out how it was to be built, run, maintained and overseen, with a maximum capacity of 300 male prisoners and 300 female prisoners.

== Subsequent developments ==
The whole act was repealed by section 1 of, and the schedule to, the Statute Law Revision Act 1873 (36 & 37 Vict. c. 91), which came into force on 5 August 1873.
