= List of acts of the Parliament of the United Kingdom from 1842 =

This is a complete list of acts of the Parliament of the United Kingdom for the year 1842.

Note that the first parliament of the United Kingdom was held in 1801; parliaments between 1707 and 1800 were either parliaments of Great Britain or of Ireland). For acts passed up until 1707, see the list of acts of the Parliament of England and the list of acts of the Parliament of Scotland. For acts passed from 1707 to 1800, see the list of acts of the Parliament of Great Britain. See also the list of acts of the Parliament of Ireland.

For acts of the devolved parliaments and assemblies in the United Kingdom, see the list of acts of the Scottish Parliament, the list of acts of the Northern Ireland Assembly, and the list of acts and measures of Senedd Cymru; see also the list of acts of the Parliament of Northern Ireland.

The number shown after each act's title is its chapter number. Acts passed before 1963 are cited using this number, preceded by the year(s) of the reign during which the relevant parliamentary session was held; thus the Union with Ireland Act 1800 is cited as "39 & 40 Geo. 3 c. 67", meaning the 67th act passed during the session that started in the 39th year of the reign of George III and which finished in the 40th year of that reign. Note that the modern convention is to use Arabic numerals in citations (thus "41 Geo. 3" rather than "41 Geo. III"). Acts of the last session of the Parliament of Great Britain and the first session of the Parliament of the United Kingdom are both cited as "41 Geo. 3".

Some of these acts have a short title. Some of these acts have never had a short title. Some of these acts have a short title given to them by later acts, such as by the Short Titles Act 1896.

== 5 & 6 Vict. ==
The second session of the 14th Parliament of the United Kingdom, which met from 3 February 1842 until 12 August 1842.

This session was also traditionally cited as 5 Vict. Sess. 2.

=== Public general acts ===
Short title	Citation	Royal assent
Long title
Appropriation Acts Amendment Act 1842 (repealed)	5 & 6 Vict. c. 1	15 February 1842
An Act better to provide for the Application to the Service of the Year One thousand eight hundred and forty-one of the Sums granted in the Two last Sessions of Parliament. (Repealed by Statute Law Revision Act 1874 (No. 2) (37 & 38 Vict. c. 96))
Duchy of Cornwall Leases, etc. Act 1842 (repealed)	5 & 6 Vict. c. 2	15 March 1842
An Act to enable His Royal Highness Albert Edward Prince of Wales to make Leases and Grants of Land and Hereditaments, Parcel of His said Royal Highness' Duchy of Cornwall, or annexed to the same; and for the other Purposes therein mentioned. (Repealed by Duchy of Cornwall Management Act 1863 (26 & 27 Vict. c. 49))
Van Diemen's Land Act 1842 (repealed)	5 & 6 Vict. c. 3	15 March 1842
An Act to confirm an Act of the legislature of Van Diemen's Land, for authorizing the Levy of certain Duties of Customs and on Spirits. (Repealed by Statute Law Revision Act 1874 (No. 2) (37 & 38 Vict. c. 96))
Bishoprics, etc., in West Indies Act 1842 (repealed)	5 & 6 Vict. c. 4	23 March 1842
An Act to provide for the Increase of the Number of Bishoprics and Archdeaconries in the West Indies, and to amend the several Acts relating thereto. (Repealed by Statute Law (Repeals) Act 1971 (c. 52))
Loan Societies Act 1842 (repealed)	5 & 6 Vict. c. 5	23 March 1842
An Act to continue to the First Day of August One thousand eight hundred and forty-three the Act (Note: Loan Societies Act 1840 (3 & 4 Vict. c. 110)) to amend the Laws relating to Loan Societies. (Repealed by Statute Law Revision Act 1874 (No. 2) (37 & 38 Vict. c. 96))
Newgate Gaol, Dublin Act 1842 (repealed)	5 & 6 Vict. c. 6	23 March 1842
An Act to amend an Act of Her present Majesty (Note: Newgate Gaol, Dublin Act 1840 (3 & 4 Vict. c. 53)) for vacating any Presentment for rebuilding the Gaol of Newgate in Dublin, and any Contract between the Commissioners for rebuilding the said Gaol and the Contractor. (Repealed by Statute Law Revision Act 1874 (No. 2) (37 & 38 Vict. c. 96))
Parish Apprentices Act 1842 (repealed)	5 & 6 Vict. c. 7	23 March 1842
An Act to explain the Acts for the better Regulation of certain Apprentices. (Repealed by Poor Law Act 1927 (17 & 18 Geo. 5. c. 14))
Supply Act 1842 (repealed)	5 & 6 Vict. c. 8	23 March 1842
An Act to apply the Sum of Eight Millions out of the Consolidated Fund to the Service of the Year One thousand eight hundred and forty-two. (Repealed by Statute Law Revision Act 1874 (No. 2) (37 & 38 Vict. c. 96))
Advances for Public Works Act 1842 (repealed)	5 & 6 Vict. c. 9	22 April 1842
An Act to authorize the Advance of Money out of the Consolidated Fund to a limited Amount for carrying on Public Works and Fisheries, and Employment of the Poor; and to amend the Acts authorizing the Issue of Exchequer Bills for the like Purposes. (Repealed by Public Works Loans Act 1875 (38 & 39 Vict. c. 89))
Indemnity Act 1842 (repealed)	5 & 6 Vict. c. 10	22 April 1842
An Act to indemnify such Persons in the United Kingdom as have omitted to qualify themselves for Offices and Employments, and to extend the Time limited for those Purposes respectively until the Twenty-fifth Day of March One thousand eight hundred and forty-three; and for the Relief of Clerks to Attornies and Solicitors in certain Cases. (Repealed by Promissory Oaths Act 1871 (34 & 35 Vict. c. 48))
Forged Exchequer Bills Act 1842 (repealed)	5 & 6 Vict. c. 11	22 April 1842
An Act for appointing Commissioners to inquire as to the Issue, Receipt, Circulation, and Possession of certain forged Exchequer Bills. (Repealed by Statute Law Revision Act 1874 (No. 2) (37 & 38 Vict. c. 96))
Mutiny Act 1842 (repealed)	5 & 6 Vict. c. 12	22 April 1842
An Act for punishing Mutiny and Desertion, and for the better Payment of the Army and their Quarters. (Repealed by Statute Law Revision Act 1874 (No. 2) (37 & 38 Vict. c. 96))
Marine Mutiny Act 1842 (repealed)	5 & 6 Vict. c. 13	22 April 1842
An Act for the Regulation of Her Majesty's Royal Marine Forces while on shore. (Repealed by Statute Law Revision Act 1874 (No. 2) (37 & 38 Vict. c. 96))
Duties on Corn Act 1842 (repealed)	5 & 6 Vict. c. 14	29 April 1842
An Act to amend the Laws for the Importation of Corn. (Repealed for the United Kingdom by Corn Returns Act 1882 (45 & 46 Vict. c. 37) and for the Isle of Man by Statute Law Revision (Isle of Man) Act 1991 (c. 61))
Duties on Spirits, etc. Act 1842 (repealed)	5 & 6 Vict. c. 15	29 April 1842
An Act to impose an additional Duty on Spirits, and to repeal the Allowance on Spirits made from Malt only, in Ireland. (Repealed by Statute Law Revision Act 1874 (No. 2) (37 & 38 Vict. c. 96))
Soap Duties Allowances Act 1842 (repealed)	5 & 6 Vict. c. 16	13 May 1842
An Act to continue, until the End of the Session of Parliament next after the Thirty-first Day of July One thousand eight hundred and forty-four, certain of the Allowances of the Duty of Excise on Soap used in Manufactures. (Repealed by Statute Law Revision Act 1874 (No. 2) (37 & 38 Vict. c. 96))
Timber Ships, America Act 1842 (repealed)	5 & 6 Vict. c. 17	13 May 1842
An Act for preventing, until the First Day of May One thousand eight hundred and forty-five, Ships clearing out from any Port in British North America, or in the Settlement of Honduras, from loading any Part of their Cargo of Timber upon Deck. (Repealed by Statute Law Revision Act 1874 (No. 2) (37 & 38 Vict. c. 96))
Parish Property and Parish Debts Act 1842 (repealed)	5 & 6 Vict. c. 18	13 May 1842
An Act to explain and amend the Acts regulating the Sale of Parish Property; and to make further Provision for the Discharge of Debts, Liabilities, and Engagements incurred by or on behalf of Parishes. (Repealed by Divided Parishes and Poor Law Amendment Act 1882 (45 & 46 Vict. c. 58), Poor Law Act 1927 (17 & 18 Geo. 5. c. 14) and Local Government Act 1929 (19 & 20 Geo. 5. c. 17))
Hyde Park Act 1842	5 & 6 Vict. c. 19	13 May 1842
An Act to empower the Commissioners of Her Majesty's Woods to form a new Opening from the Knightsbridge Road into Hyde Park, and a new Opening from High Street, Kensington, into an intended new Road across the Palace Green; and for annexing a Piece of Extra-parochial Ground in the Royal Garden to the respective Parishes of Saint Mary Abbots Kensington and Saint Mary Paddington in several Portions.
Victoria Park Act 1842	5 & 6 Vict. c. 20	13 May 1842
An Act to extend an Act passed in the Fourth and Fifth Years of Her present Majesty, (Note: York House and Victoria Park Act 1841 (4 & 5 Vict. c. 27)) for enabling Her Majesty's Commissioners of Woods to purchase certain Lands for Victoria Park.
Exchequer Bills Act 1842 (repealed)	5 & 6 Vict. c. 21	13 May 1842
An Act for raising the Sum of Nine millions one hundred thousand Pounds by Exchequer Bills, for the Service of the Year One thousand eight hundred and forty-two. (Repealed by Statute Law Revision Act 1874 (No. 2) (37 & 38 Vict. c. 96))
Queen's Prison Act 1842 (repealed)	5 & 6 Vict. c. 22	31 May 1842
An Act for consolidating the Queen's Bench, Fleet, and Marshalsea Prisons, and for regulating the Queen's Prison. (Repealed by Statute Law Revision (No. 2) Act 1888 (51 & 52 Vict. c. 57) and Statute Law Revision Act 1950 (14 Geo. 6. c. 6))
Turnpike Acts (Ireland) Act 1842 (repealed)	5 & 6 Vict. c. 23	31 May 1842
An Act to continue, until the Thirty-first Day of July One thousand eight hundred and forty-three, and to the End of the then Session of Parliament, the several Acts for regulating Turnpike Roads in Ireland. (Repealed by Statute Law Revision Act 1874 (No. 2) (37 & 38 Vict. c. 96))
Dublin Police Act 1842 (repealed)	5 & 6 Vict. c. 24	31 May 1842
An Act for improving the Dublin Police. (Repealed by Statute Law (Repeals) Act 2013 (c. 2))
Duties on Spirit Mixtures, etc. Act 1842 (repealed)	5 & 6 Vict. c. 25	31 May 1842
An Act to repeal the present and impose and allow new countervailing Duties and Drawbacks of Excise on Mixtures and Preparations made with Spirits, when removed from or into England, Scotland, or Ireland respectively; and to suspend for a limited Time so much of an Act of the present Session (Note: Duties on Spirits, etc. Act 1842 (5 & 6 Vict. c. 15)) as repeals the Allowance on Spirits made from Malt only in Ireland. (Repealed by Statute Law Revision Act 1874 (No. 2) (37 & 38 Vict. c. 96))
Ecclesiastical Houses of Residence Act 1842	5 & 6 Vict. c. 26	31 May 1842
An Act to alter and amend the Law relating to ecclesiastical Houses of Residence.
Ecclesiastical Leases Act 1842 (repealed)	5 & 6 Vict. c. 27	18 June 1842
An Act for better enabling Incumbents of Ecclesiastical Benefices to demise the Lands belonging to their Benefices on Farming Leases. (Repealed by Endowments and Glebe Measure 1976 (No. 4) and for the Isle of Man by Statute Law (Repeals) Act 1993 (c. 50))
Capital Punishment (Ireland) Act 1842 (repealed)	5 & 6 Vict. c. 28	18 June 1842
An Act to assimilate the Law in Ireland, as to the Punishment of Death, to the Law in England; to abolish the Punishment of Death in certain Cases in Ireland, and to substitute other Punishments in lieu thereof. (Repealed by Criminal Statutes Repeal Act 1861 (24 & 25 Vict. c. 95), Statute Law Revision Act 1874 (No. 2) (37 & 38 Vict. c. 96), Statute Law Revision (No. 2) Act 1888 (51 & 52 Vict. c. 57), Statute Law Revision (No. 2) Act 1890 (53 & 54 Vict. c. 51), Statute Law Revision Act 1892 (55 & 56 Vict. c. 19), Statute Law Revision (No. 2) Act 1893 (56 & 57 Vict. c. 54), Criminal Justice Administration Act 1914 (4 & 5 Geo. 5. c. 58) and Criminal Law Act (Northern Ireland) 1967 (c. 18 (N.I.)))
Pentonville Prison Act 1842 (repealed)	5 & 6 Vict. c. 29	18 June 1842
An Act for establishing a Prison at Pentonville. (Repealed by Criminal Justice Act 1948 (11 & 12 Geo. 6. c. 58))
Roasted Malt for Colouring Beer Act 1842 (repealed)	5 & 6 Vict. c. 30	18 June 1842
An Act to provide Regulations for preparing and using Roasted Malt in colouring Beer. (Repealed by Inland Revenue Act 1880 (43 & 44 Vict. c. 20))
Harwich, etc., Election Act 1842 (repealed)	5 & 6 Vict. c. 31	18 June 1842
An Act to indemnify Witnesses who may give Evidence before the Committee appointed by the House of Commons to inquire "whether corrupt Compromises have been entered into in the Cases of Election Petitions presented from Harwich, Nottingham, Lewes, Penryn, and Falmouth, Bridport, and Reading, for the Purpose of avoiding Investigation into gross Bribery alleged to have been practised at the Elections for the aforesaid Towns, and whether such Bribery has really taken place." (Repealed by Statute Law Revision Act 1874 (No. 2) (37 & 38 Vict. c. 96))
Fines and Recoveries Act 1842 (repealed)	5 & 6 Vict. c. 32	18 June 1842
An Act for better recording Fines and Recoveries in Wales and Cheshire. (Repealed by Administration of Justice Act 1965 (c. 2))
Civil Bill Decrees (Ireland) Act 1842 (repealed)	5 & 6 Vict. c. 33	18 June 1842
An Act to amend and explain so much of Two Acts, of the Sixth and Seventh Years of His late Majesty, (Note: Civil Bill Courts (Ireland) Act 1836 (6 & 7 Will. 4. c. 75)) and of the First Year of Her present Majesty, (Note: Small Debts' Recovery (Ireland) Act 1837 (7 Will. 4 & 1 Vict. c. 43)) as relates to the Execution of Civil Bill Decrees for the Possession of Land in Ireland. (Repealed by Civil Bill Courts (Ireland) Act 1851 (14 & 15 Vict. c. 57))
Sugar Duties Act 1842 (repealed)	5 & 6 Vict. c. 34	18 June 1842
An Act for granting to Her Majesty, until the Fifth Day of July One thousand eight hundred and forty-three, certain Duties on Sugar imported into the United Kingdom, for the Service of the Year One thousand eight hundred and forty-two. (Repealed by Statute Law Revision Act 1874 (No. 2) (37 & 38 Vict. c. 96))
Income Tax Act 1842 (repealed)	5 & 6 Vict. c. 35	22 June 1842
An Act for granting to Her Majesty Duties on Profits arising from Property, Professions, Trades, and Offices, until the Sixth Day of April, One thousand eight hundred and forty-five. (Repealed by Income Tax Act 1918 (8 & 9 Geo. 5. c. 40))
Australian Colonies Waste Lands Act 1842 (repealed)	5 & 6 Vict. c. 36	22 June 1842
An Act for regulating the Sale of Waste Land belonging to the Crown in the Australian Colonies. (Repealed by Australian Waste Lands Act 1855 (18 & 19 Vict. c. 56))
Land Tax Act 1842 (repealed)	5 & 6 Vict. c. 37	30 June 1842
An Act to continue until the Fifth Day of April One thousand eight hundred and forty-four Compositions for Assessed Taxes; and to amend the Laws relating to the Land and Assessed Taxes. (Repealed by Finance Act 1949 (12, 13 & 14 Geo. 6. c. 47))
Quarter Sessions Act 1842 (repealed)	5 & 6 Vict. c. 38	30 June 1842
An Act to define the Jurisdiction of Justices in General and Quarter Sessions of the Peace. (Repealed by Courts Act 1971 (c. 23))
Factors Act 1842 or the Law of Merchants Act Amendment Act 1842 (repealed)	5 & 6 Vict. c. 39	30 June 1842
An Act to amend the Law relating to Advances bonâ fide made to Agents intrusted with Goods. (Repealed for England and Wales and Ireland by Factors Act 1889 (52 & 53 Vict. c. 45) and for Scotland by Factors (Scotland) Act 1890 (53 & 54 Vict. c. 40))
Argentine Treaty Act 1842 (repealed)	5 & 6 Vict. c. 40	30 June 1842
An Act for carrying into effect the Treaty between Her Majesty and the Argentine Confederation for the Abolition of the Slave Trade. (Repealed by Slave Trade Act 1873 (36 & 37 Vict. c. 88))
Treaty with Hayti Act 1842 (repealed)	5 & 6 Vict. c. 41	30 June 1842
An Act for carrying into effect a Convention between Her Majesty and the Republic of Hayti (Note: Hayti is an old spelling for Haiti.) for the more effectual Suppression of the Slave Trade. (Repealed by Slave Trade Act 1873 (36 & 37 Vict. c. 88))
Slave Trade Suppression Act 1842 (repealed)	5 & 6 Vict. c. 42	30 June 1842
An Act for better and more effectually carrying into effect Treaties and Conventions with Foreign States for suppressing the Slave Trade. (Repealed by Slave Trade Act 1873 (36 & 37 Vict. c. 88))
Confirmation of Certain Proceedings Act 1842 (repealed)	5 & 6 Vict. c. 43	1 July 1842
An Act to confirm certain Proceedings which may have been had after the passing of the Act intituled "An Act to define the Jurisdiction of Justices in General and Quarter Sessions of the Peace." (Note: Quarter Sessions Act 1842 (5 & 6 Vict. c. 38)) (Repealed by Statute Law Revision Act 1874 (No. 2) (37 & 38 Vict. c. 96))
Licensing Act 1842 (repealed)	5 & 6 Vict. c. 44	1 July 1842
An Act for the Transfer of Licences and Regulation of Public Houses. (Repealed by Statute Law Revision Act 1874 (No. 2) (37 & 38 Vict. c. 96), Licensing (Consolidation) Act 1910 (10 Edw. 7 & 1 Geo. 5. c. 24) and Licensing Act 1961 (9 & 10 Eliz. 2. c. 61))
Copyright Act 1842 (repealed)	5 & 6 Vict. c. 45	1 July 1842
An Act to amend the Law of Copyright. (Repealed by Copyright Act 1911 (1 & 2 Geo. 5. c. 46))
Justices (Ireland) Act 1842 (repealed)	5 & 6 Vict. c. 46	1 July 1842
An Act to amend an Act of the Third and Fourth Years of Her present Majesty, (Note: Municipal Corporations (Ireland) Act 1840 (3 & 4 Vict. c. 108)) for the Regulation of Municipal Corporations in Ireland. (Repealed by Magistrates' Courts Act (Northern Ireland) 1964 (c. 21 (N.I.)))
Customs Act 1842 (repealed)	5 & 6 Vict. c. 47	9 July 1842
An Act to amend the Laws relating to the Customs. (Repealed by Hallmarking Act 1973 (c. 43))
Forest of Dean (Poor Relief) Act 1842 or the Dean Forest (Poor) Act 1842 (repealed)	5 & 6 Vict. c. 48	9 July 1842
An Act to provide for the Relief of the Poor in the Forest of Dean and other Extra-parochial Places in and near the Hundred of Saint Briavel's in the County of Gloucester. (Repealed by Statute Law Revision Act 1953 (2 & 3 Eliz. 2. c. 5))
Colonial Duties Act 1842 (repealed)	5 & 6 Vict. c. 49	16 July 1842
An Act to amend the Laws for the Regulation of the Trade of the British Possessions abroad. (Repealed by Customs (Repeal) Act 1845 (8 & 9 Vict. c. 84))
Poor Rates Act 1842 (repealed)	5 & 6 Vict. c. 50	16 July 1842
An Act to continue, until the First Day o£ October One thousand eight hundred and forty-three, the Exemption of Inhabitants of Parishes, Townships, and Villages from Liability to be rated as such, in respect of Stock in Trade or other Property, to the Relief of the Poor. (Repealed by Statute Law Revision Act 1874 (No. 2) (37 & 38 Vict. c. 96))
Treason Act 1842	5 & 6 Vict. c. 51	16 July 1842
An Act for providing for the further Security and Protection of Her Majesty's Person.
Sudbury Disfranchisement Act 1842 (repealed)	5 & 6 Vict. c. 52	16 July 1842
An Act to indemnify Witnesses who may give Evidence before the Lords Spiritual and Temporal on a Bill to exclude the Borough of Sudbury from sending Burgesses to serve in Parliament. (Repealed by Statute Law Revision Act 1874 (No. 2) (37 & 38 Vict. c. 96))
District Courts and Prisons Act 1842 (repealed)	5 & 6 Vict. c. 53	30 July 1842
An Act to encourage the Establishment of District Courts and Prisons. (Repealed by Prison Act 1865 (28 & 29 Vict. c. 126))
Tithe Act 1842 (repealed)	5 & 6 Vict. c. 54	30 July 1842
An Act to amend the Acts for the commutation of tithes in England and Wales, and to continue the Officers appointed under the said Acts for a Time to be limited. (Repealed by Statute Law (Repeals) Act 1998 (c. 43))
Railway Regulation Act 1842	5 & 6 Vict. c. 55	30 July 1842
An Act for the better Regulation of Railways and for the Conveyance of Troops.
Customs (Amendment) Act 1842 (repealed)	5 & 6 Vict. c. 56	30 July 1842
An Act for further amending the Laws relating to the Customs. (Repealed by Customs (Repeal) Act 1845 (8 & 9 Vict. c. 84) and Hall-marking of Foreign Plate Act 1939 (2 & 3 Geo. 6. c. 36))
Poor Law Amendment Act 1842 (repealed)	5 & 6 Vict. c. 57	30 July 1842
An Act to continue until the Thirty-first Day of July One thousand eight hundred and forty-seven, and to the End of the then next Session of Parliament, the Poor Law Commission; and for the further Amendment of the Laws relating to the Poor in England. (Repealed by National Assistance Act 1948 (11 & 12 Geo. 6. c. 29))
Ecclesiastical Jurisdiction Act 1842 (repealed)	5 & 6 Vict. c. 58	30 July 1842
An Act for further suspending, until the First Day of October One thousand eight hundred and forty-three, the Operation of the new Arrangement of Dioceses, so far as it affects the existing Ecclesiastical Jurisdictions. (Repealed by Statute Law Revision Act 1874 (No. 2) (37 & 38 Vict. c. 96))
Slave Trade Suppression Act (No. 2) 1842 (repealed)	5 & 6 Vict. c. 59	30 July 1842
An Act to continue until the First Day of August One thousand eight hundred and forty-three an Act for authorizing Her Majesty to carry into immediate Execution, by Orders in Council, any Treaties for the Suppression of the Slave Trade. (Repealed by Slave Trade Act 1873 (36 & 37 Vict. c. 88))
Turnpike Acts Continuance Act 1842 (repealed)	5 & 6 Vict. c. 60	30 July 1842
An Act to continue until the First Day of October One thousand eight hundred and forty three certain Turnpike Acts. (Repealed by Statute Law Revision Act 1874 (No. 2) (37 & 38 Vict. c. 96))
South Australia Act 1842 (repealed)	5 & 6 Vict. c. 61	30 July 1842
An Act to provide for the better Government of South Australia. (Repealed for England and Wales by Criminal Justice Act 1948 (11 & 12 Geo. 6. c. 58) and for Scotland by Criminal Justice (Scotland) Act 1949 (12, 13 & 14 Geo. 6. c. 94))
Dublin, Sale of Property Act 1842	5 & 6 Vict. c. 62	30 July 1842
An Act to extend the Provisions of an Act of the Fourth Year of Her present Majesty, (Note: Dublin, Purchase of Land Act 1841 (4 & 5 Vict. c. 16)) for enabling the Commissioners of Wide Streets to sell, and Her Majesty to purchase, certain Hereditaments in the City of Dublin, on the North Bank of the River Anna Liffey.
Fisheries, Convention with France Act 1842 (repealed)	5 & 6 Vict. c. 63	30 July 1842
An Act to continue until the First Day of August One thousand eight hundred and forty-three an Act for carrying into effect a Convention between Her Majesty and the King of the French relative to the Fisheries on the Coasts of the British Islands and of France. (Repealed by Statute Law Revision Act 1874 (No. 2) (37 & 38 Vict. c. 96))
London Bridge Act 1842	5 & 6 Vict. c. 64	30 July 1842
An Act for regulating the Priorities of Monies authorized to be charged on a Fund called "The London Bridge Approaches Fund."
Dean Forest Act 1842 or the Ecclesiastical Districts in Forest of Dean Act 1842 (repealed)	5 & 6 Vict. c. 65	30 July 1842
An Act to divide the Forest of Dean in the County of Gloucester into Ecclesiastical Districts. (Repealed by Wild Creatures and Forest Laws Act 1971 (c. 47))
Exchequer Bills (No. 2) Act 1842 (repealed)	5 & 6 Vict. c. 66	30 July 1842
An Act for further regulating the Preparation and Issue of Exchequer Bills. (Repealed by Exchequer Bills and Bonds Act 1866 (29 & 30 Vict. c. 25))
Perth Prison Act 1842 (repealed)	5 & 6 Vict. c. 67	30 July 1842
An Act for the better regulating the Number of Prisoners admitted to the General Prison at Perth. (Repealed by Prisons (Scotland) Act 1844 (7 & 8 Vict. c. 34))
Textile Manufactures (Ireland) Act 1842 (repealed)	5 & 6 Vict. c. 68	30 July 1842
An Act to amend, and continue to the Twenty-seventh Day of July One Thousand eight hundred and forty-three, and to the End of the then next Session of Parliament, and Act of the Third and Fourth Years of Her present Majesty, (Note: Textile Manufactures (Ireland) Act 1840 (3 & 4 Vict. c. 91)) for the more effectual Prevention of Frauds and Abuses committed by Weavers, Sewers, and other Persons employed in the Linen, Hempen, Union, Cotton, Silk, and Woollen Manufactures in Ireland, and for the better Payment of their Wages. (Repealed by Statute Law Revision Act 1874 (No. 2) (37 & 38 Vict. c. 96), Statute Law Revision (No. 2) Act 1888 (51 & 52 Vict. c. 57) and Statute Law Revision (No. 2) Act 1890 (53 & 54 Vict. c. 51) and Statute Law Revision Act (Northern Ireland) 1954 (c. 35 (N.I.)))
Perpetuation of Testimony Act 1842 (repealed)	5 & 6 Vict. c. 69	30 July 1842
An Act for perpetuating Testimony in certain Cases. (Repealed for England and Wales by Statute Law Revision and Civil Procedure Act 1883 (46 & 47 Vict. c. 49), for Northern Ireland by Judicature (Northern Ireland) Act 1978 (c. 23) and for Scotland by Statute Law (Repeals) Act 1981 (c. 19))
Chelsea Hospital Out-pensioners Act 1842 (repealed)	5 & 6 Vict. c. 70	30 July 1842
An Act to amend the Laws relating to the Payment of Out-Pensioners of Chelsea Hospital. (Repealed by Statute Law Revision Act 1874 (No. 2) (37 & 38 Vict. c. 96))
Military Savings Banks Act 1842 (repealed)	5 & 6 Vict. c. 71	30 July 1842
An Act to establish Military Savings Banks. (Repealed by Military Savings Banks Act 1859 (22 & 23 Vict. c. 20))
Militia Ballots Suspension Act 1842 (repealed)	5 & 6 Vict. c. 72	30 July 1842
An Act to suspend until the Thirty-first Day of August One thousand eight hundred and forty-three the making of Lists and the Ballots and Enrolments for the Militia of the United Kingdom. (Repealed by Statute Law Revision Act 1874 (No. 2) (37 & 38 Vict. c. 96))
Controverted Elections Act 1842 (repealed)	5 & 6 Vict. c. 73	30 July 1842
An Act to continue until the Thirty-first Day of July One thousand eight hundred and forty-three; and to the End of the then Session of Parliament, an Act (Note: Controverted Elections Act 1841 (4 & 5 Vict. c. 58)) for amending the Law for the Trial of controverted Elections. (Repealed by Statute Law Revision Act 1874 (No. 2) (37 & 38 Vict. c. 96))
University of Dublin Registration Act 1842 (repealed)	5 & 6 Vict. c. 74	30 July 1842
An Act to amend an Act of the Second and Third Years of His late Majesty, (Note: Parliamentary Boundaries (Ireland) Act 1832 (2 & 3 Will. 4. c. 89)) "to amend the Representation of the People of Ireland," in respect of the Right of Voting in the University of Dublin. (Repealed by Statute Law Revision Act 1874 (No. 2) (37 & 38 Vict. c. 96), Statute Law Revision Act 1892 (55 & 56 Vict. c. 19) and Representation of the People Act 1918 (7 & 8 Geo. 5. c. 64))
Charitable Pawn Offices (Ireland) Act 1842 (repealed)	5 & 6 Vict. c. 75	30 July 1842
An Act to remove Doubts touching the Law relating to Charitable Pawn or Deposit Offices in Ireland. (Repealed by Consumer Credit Act 1974 (c. 39))
Australian Constitutions Act 1842	5 & 6 Vict. c. 76	30 July 1842
An Act for the Government of New South Wales and Van Diemen's Land.
Grand Jury Presentments (Ireland) Act 1842 (repealed)	5 & 6 Vict. c. 77	5 August 1842
An Act to enable Grand Juries at the ensuing Summer and Spring Assizes to make certain Presentments in Counties of Cities and Towns in Ireland; and to remove Doubts as to the Jurisdiction of Justices of the Peace in Places recently annexed to Counties at large in Ireland. (Repealed by Statute Law Revision Act 1874 (No. 2) (37 & 38 Vict. c. 96))
Exchange, Crown and Eton College Act 1842 (repealed)	5 & 6 Vict. c. 78	5 August 1842
An Act for effecting an Exchange between Her Majesty and the Provost and College of Eton. (Repealed by Statute Law (Repeals) Act 1978 (c. 45))
Railway Passenger Duty Act 1842 (repealed)	5 & 6 Vict. c. 79	5 August 1842
An Act to repeal the Duties payable on Stage Carriages and on Passengers conveyed upon Railways, and certain other Stamp Duties in Great Britain, and to grant other Duties in lieu thereof; and also to amend the Laws relating to the Stamp Duties. (Repealed by Revenue Act 1869 (32 & 33 Vict. c. 14), Inland Revenue Repeal Act 1870 (33 & 34 Vict. c. 99), Statute Law Revision Act 1874 (No. 2) (37 & 38 Vict. c. 96), Statute Law Revision (No. 2) Act 1888 (51 & 52 Vict. c. 57), Statute Law Revision (No. 2) Act 1890 (53 & 54 Vict. c. 51), Finance Act 1929 (19 & 20 Geo. 5. c. 21), Transport Charges &c. (Miscellaneous Provisions) Act 1954 (2 & 3 Eliz. 2. c. 64), Statute Law Revision Act 1964 (c. 79) and Finance Act 1975 (c. 7))
Income Tax (Foreign Dividends) Act 1842 (repealed)	5 & 6 Vict. c. 80	5 August 1842
An Act to grant Relief from the Duties of Assessed Taxes in certain Cases, and to provide for the assessing and charging the Proper Tax on Dividends payable out of the Revenue of Foreign States. (Repealed by Income Tax Act 1918 (8 & 9 Geo. 5. c. 40))
Game Certificates (Ireland) Act 1842 (repealed)	5 & 6 Vict. c. 81	5 August 1842
An Act to transfer the Collection and Management of the Duties on Certificates to kill Game in Ireland to the Commissioners of Excise. (Repealed by Statute Law Revision Act 1874 (No. 2) (37 & 38 Vict. c. 96), Statute Law Revision (No. 2) Act 1888 (51 & 52 Vict. c. 57) and Miscellaneous Transferred Excise Duties Act (Northern Ireland) 1953 (c. 24 (N.I.)))
Stamp Duties (Ireland) Act 1842 (repealed)	5 & 6 Vict. c. 82	5 August 1842
An Act to assimilate the Stamp Duties in Great Britain and Ireland, and to make Regulations for collecting and managing the same, until the Tenth Day of October One thousand eight hundred and forty-five. (Repealed by Statute Law (Repeals) Act 1978 (c. 45))
St. Briavels Small Debts Court Act 1842 or the St. Briavels (Court of Requests) Act 1842 (repealed)	5 & 6 Vict. c. 83	5 August 1842
An Act to abolish the Court of Saint Briavel's, and for the more easy and speedy Recovery of Small Debts within the Hundred of Saint Briavel's, in the County of Gloucester. (Repealed by County Courts Act 1846 (9 & 10 Vict. c. 95) and Statute Law (Repeals) Act 1969 (c. 52))
Lunacy Act 1842 (repealed)	5 & 6 Vict. c. 84	5 August 1842
An Act to alter and amend the Practice and Course of Proceeding under Commissions in the Nature of Writs De lunatico inquirendo. (Repealed by Statute Law Revision Act 1874 (No. 2) (37 & 38 Vict. c. 96))
Joint Stock Banking Companies Act 1842 (repealed)	5 & 6 Vict. c. 85	5 August 1842
An Act to amend the Law relative to legal Proceedings by certain Joint Stock Banking Companies against their own Members, and by such Members against the Companies. (Repealed by Statute Law Revision Act 1874 (No. 2) (37 & 38 Vict. c. 96))
Exchequer Court Act 1842 (repealed)	5 & 6 Vict. c. 86	5 August 1842
An Act for abolishing certain Offices on the Revenue Side of the Court of Exchequer in England, and for regulating the Office of Her Majesty's Remembrancer in that Court. (Repealed by Administration of Justice Act 1965 (c. 2))
Lunatic Asylums Act 1842 (repealed)	5 & 6 Vict. c. 87	5 August 1842
An Act to amend and continue for Three Years, and from thence to the End of the next Session of Parliament, the Laws relating to Houses licensed by the Metropolitan Commissioners and Justices of the Peace for the Reception of Insane Persons, and for the Inspection of County Asylums and Public Hospitals for the Reception of Insane Persons. (Repealed by Lunacy Act 1845 (8 & 9 Vict. c. 100))
Western Australia Government Act 1842 (repealed)	5 & 6 Vict. c. 88	5 August 1842
An Act to continue until the Thirty-first Day of December One thousand eight hundred and forty-four, and to the End of the then next Session of Parliament, an Act of the Tenth Year of King George the Fourth (Note: Government of Western Australia Act 1829 (10 Geo. 4. c. 22)) for providing for the Government of His Majesty's Settlements in Western Australia on the Western Coast of New Holland. (Repealed by Statute Law Revision Act 1874 (No. 2) (37 & 38 Vict. c. 96))
Drainage (Ireland) Act 1842 (repealed)	5 & 6 Vict. c. 89	5 August 1842
An Act to promote the Drainage of Lands, and Improvement of Navigation and Water Power in connexion with such Drainage, in Ireland. (Repealed by Erne Drainage and Development Act (Northern Ireland) 1950 (c. 15 (N.I)) and Inland Navigation Act (Northern Ireland) 1954 (c. 1 (N.I.)))
Militia Pay Act 1842 (repealed)	5 & 6 Vict. c. 90	10 August 1842
An Act to defray the Charge of the Pay, Clothing, and contingent and other Expences of the Disembodied Militia in Great Britain and Ireland; and to grant Allowances in certain Cases to Subaltern Officers, Adjutants, Paymasters, Quartermasters, Surgeons, Assistant Surgeons, Surgeons Mates, and Serjeant Majors of the Militia, until the First Day of July One thousand eight hundred and forty-three. (Repealed by Statute Law Revision Act 1874 (No. 2) (37 & 38 Vict. c. 96))
Slave Trade Suppression Act (No. 3) 1842 (repealed)	5 & 6 Vict. c. 91	10 August 1842
An Act to amend an Act of the Second and Third Years of Her Majesty, (Note: Slave Trade Suppression (No. 2) Act 1839 (2 & 3 Vict. c. 73)) for the Suppression of the Slave Trade. (Repealed by Slave Trade Act 1873 (36 & 37 Vict. c. 88))
Bonded Corn Act 1842 (repealed)	5 & 6 Vict. c. 92	10 August 1842
An Act to permit, until the Thirty-first Day of August One thousand eight hundred and forty-five, Wheat to be delivered from the Warehouse or the Vessel Duty-free, upon the previous Substitution of an equivalent Quantity of Flour or Biscuit in the Warehouse. (Repealed by Statute Law Revision Act 1874 (No. 2) (37 & 38 Vict. c. 96))
Tobacco Act 1842 (repealed)	5 & 6 Vict. c. 93	10 August 1842
An Act to amend an Act of the Fourth Year of Her present Majesty, (Note: Tobacco Act 1840 (3 & 4 Vict. c. 18)) to discontinue the Excise Survey on Tobacco, and to provide other Regulations in lieu thereof. (Repealed by Customs and Excise Act 1952 (15 & 16 Geo. 6 & 1 Eliz. 2. c. 44))
Defence Act 1842	5 & 6 Vict. c. 94	10 August 1842
An Act to consolidate and amend the laws relating to the services of the Ordnance Department, and the vesting and purchase of lands and hereditaments for those services, and for the defence and security of the Realm.
Four Courts Marshalsea (Ireland) Act 1842 (repealed)	5 & 6 Vict. c. 95	10 August 1842
An Act for consolidating the Four Courts Marshalsea, Dublin, Sheriffs Prison, Dublin, and City Marshalsea, Dublin, and for regulating the Four Courts Marshalsea in Ireland. (Repealed by Statute Law Revision Act 1892 (55 & 56 Vict. c. 19))
Dublin Baronies Act 1842	5 & 6 Vict. c. 96	10 August 1842
An Act to alter the Number and define the Boundaries of the several Baronies of the County of Dublin.
Limitations of Actions and Costs Act 1842 or the Limitation of Actions and Costs Act 1842	5 & 6 Vict. c. 97	10 August 1842
An Act to amend the Law relating to Double Costs, Notices of Action, Limitations of Actions, and Pleas of the General Issue, under certain Acts of Parliament.
Prisons Act 1842 (repealed)	5 & 6 Vict. c. 98	10 August 1842
An Act to amend the Laws concerning Prisons. (Repealed by Sheriffs Act 1887 (50 & 51 Vict. c. 55), Statute Law Revision (No. 2) Act 1890 (53 & 54 Vict. c. 51), Criminal Justice Act 1948 (11 & 12 Geo. 6. c. 58) and Statute Law Revision Act 1953 (2 & 3 Eliz. 2. c. 5))
Mines and Collieries Act 1842 or the Mines Act 1842 (repealed)	5 & 6 Vict. c. 99	10 August 1842
An Act to prohibit the Employment of Women and Girls in Mines and Collieries, to regulate the Employment of Boys, and to make other Provisions relating to Persons working therein. (Repealed by Coal Mines Regulation Act 1872 (35 & 36 Vict. c. 76) and Metalliferous Mines Regulation Act 1872 (35 & 36 Vict. c. 77))
Copyright of Designs Act 1842 or the Ornamental Designs Act 1842 (repealed)	5 & 6 Vict. c. 100	10 August 1842
An Act to consolidate and amend the Laws relating to the Copyright of Designs for ornamenting Articles of Manufacture. (Repealed by Patents, Designs, and Trade Marks Act 1883 (46 & 47 Vict. c. 57))
Slave Trade Suppression Act (No. 4) 1842 (repealed)	5 & 6 Vict. c. 101	10 August 1842
An Act for extending to the Governors and Officers of the East India Company the Powers given by an Act of the Fifth Year of King George the Fourth (Note: Slave Trade Act 1824 (5 Geo. 4. c. 113)) to Her Majesty's Governors and Officers for the more effectual Suppression of the Importation of Slaves into India by Sea. (Repealed by Slave Trade Act 1873 (36 & 37 Vict. c. 88))
Bribery at Elections Act 1842 (repealed)	5 & 6 Vict. c. 102	10 August 1842
An act for the better Discovery and Prevention of Bribery and Treating at the Election of Members of Parliament. (Repealed by Parliamentary Elections Act 1868 (31 & 32 Vict. c. 125))
Court of Chancery Act 1842 (repealed)	5 & 6 Vict. c. 103	10 August 1842
An Act for abolishing certain Offices of the High Court of Chancery in England. (Repealed by Supreme Court of Judicature (Consolidation) Act 1925 (15 & 16 Geo. 5. c. 49))
Municipal Corporations (Ireland) Act 1842 (repealed)	5 & 6 Vict. c. 104	10 August 1842
An Act to explain and amend certain Enactments contained respectively in the Acts for the Regulation of Municipal Corporations in England and Wales, and in Ireland. (Repealed for England and Wales by Municipal Corporations Act 1882 (45 & 46 Vict. c. 50) and for Northern Ireland by Local Government (Members and Officers) Act (Northern Ireland) 1964 (c. 14 (N.I.)))
Reclamation of Lands, etc. (Ireland) Act 1842 (repealed)	5 & 6 Vict. c. 105	10 August 1842
An Act to amend an Act of the First and Second Years of His late Majesty King William the Fourth, (Note: Reclamation of Lands, etc. (Ireland) Act 1831 (1 & 2 Will. 4. c. 57)) to empower Landed Proprietors in Ireland to sink, embank, and remove Obstructions in Rivers. (Repealed by Statute Law Revision Act 1892 (55 & 56 Vict. c. 19))
Fisheries (Ireland) Act 1842	5 & 6 Vict. c. 106	10 August 1842
An Act to regulate the Irish Fisheries.
Passengers Act 1842 or the Passenger Act 1842 or the Passengers in Merchant Ships Act 1842 (repealed)	5 & 6 Vict. c. 107	12 August 1842
An Act for regulating the Carriage of Passengers in Merchant Vessels. (Repealed by Passengers Act 1849 (12 & 13 Vict. c. 33))
Ecclesiastical Leasing Act 1842 (repealed)	5 & 6 Vict. c. 108	12 August 1842
An Act for enabling Ecclesiastical Corporations, aggregate and sole, to grant Leases for long Terms of Years. (Repealed by Statute Law (Repeals) Measure 2018 (No. 1))
Parish Constables Act 1842 (repealed)	5 & 6 Vict. c. 109	12 August 1842
An Act for the Appointment and Payment of Parish Constables. (Repealed by Police Act 1964 (c. 48))
Coventry Act 1842 (repealed)	5 & 6 Vict. c. 110	12 August 1842
An Act to annex the County of the City of Coventry to Warwickshire, and to define the Boundary of the City of Coventry. (Repealed by Statute Law (Repeals) Act 1975 (c. 10))
Borough Charters Confirmation Act 1842 (repealed)	5 & 6 Vict. c. 111	12 August 1842
An Act to confirm the Incorporation of certain Boroughs, and to indemnify such Persons as have sustained Loss thereby. (Repealed by Statute Law Revision Act 1874 (No. 2) (37 & 38 Vict. c. 96))
Sees of St. Asaph and Bangor Act 1842 (repealed)	5 & 6 Vict. c. 112	12 August 1842
An Act for suspending, until the First Day of October One thousand eight hundred and forty-three, Appointments to certain Ecclesiastical Preferments in the Dioceses of Saint Asaph and Bangor, and for securing certain Property to the said Sees. (Repealed by Statute Law Revision Act 1874 (No. 2) (37 & 38 Vict. c. 96))
Marriages Confirmation (Ireland) Act 1842 (repealed)	5 & 6 Vict. c. 113	12 August 1842
An Act for Confirmation of certain Marriages in Ireland. (Repealed by Statute Law (Repeals) Act 1977 (c. 18))
Slave Trade Suppression Act (No. 4) 1842 (repealed)	5 & 6 Vict. c. 114	12 August 1842
An Act to repeal so much of an Act of the Second and Third Years of Her present Majesty, for the Suppression of the Slave Trade, as relates to Portugueze Vessels. (Repealed by Slave Trade Act 1873 (36 & 37 Vict. c. 88))
Exchequer Bills Act 1842 (repealed)	5 & 6 Vict. c. 115	12 August 1842
An Act for raising the Sum of Nine millions one hundred and ninety-three thousand Pounds by Exchequer Bills, for the Service of the Year One thousand eight hundred and forty-two. (Repealed by Statute Law Revision Act 1874 (No. 2) (37 & 38 Vict. c. 96))
Insolvent Debtors Act 1842 (repealed)	5 & 6 Vict. c. 116	12 August 1842
An Act for the Relief of Insolvent Debtors. (Repealed by Bankruptcy Act 1861 (24 & 25 Vict. c. 134))
Manchester, etc., Police Act 1842 (repealed)	5 & 6 Vict. c. 117	12 August 1842
An Act to amend and continue until the First Day of October One thousand eight hundred and forty-two the Acts regulating the Police of Manchester, Birmingham, and Bolton. (Repealed by Statute Law Revision Act 1874 (No. 2) (37 & 38 Vict. c. 96))
Canada Loan Guarantee Act 1842 (repealed)	5 & 6 Vict. c. 118	12 August 1842
An Act for guaranteeing the Payment of the Interest on a Loan of One million five hundred thousand Pounds to be raised by the Province of Canada. (Repealed by Statute Law Revision Act 1874 (No. 2) (37 & 38 Vict. c. 96))
Indian Bishops Act 1842 (repealed)	5 & 6 Vict. c. 119	12 August 1842
An Act to enable Her Majesty to grant Furlough Allowances to the Bishops of Calcutta, Madras, and Bombay who shall return to Europe for a limited Period after residing in India a sufficient Time to entitle them to the highest Scale of Pension. (Repealed by Government of India Act 1915 (5 & 6 Geo. 5. c. 61))
Newfoundland Act 1842 (repealed)	5 & 6 Vict. c. 120	12 August 1842
An Act for amending the Constitution of the Government of Newfoundland. (Repealed by Statute Law Revision Act 1959 (7 & 8 Eliz. 2. c. 68))
Appropriation Act 1842 (repealed)	5 & 6 Vict. c. 121	12 August 1842
An Act to apply a Sum out of the Consolidated Fund, and certain other Sums, to the Service of the Year One thousand eight hundred and forty-two, and to appropriate the Supplies granted in this Session of Parliament. (Repealed by Statute Law Revision Act 1874 (No. 2) (37 & 38 Vict. c. 96))
Bankruptcy Act 1842 (repealed)	5 & 6 Vict. c. 122	12 August 1842
An Act for the Amendment of the Law of Bankruptcy. (Repealed by Bankruptcy Repeal and Insolvent Court Act 1869 (32 & 33 Vict. c. 83))
Private Lunatic Asylums (Ireland) Act 1842 (repealed)	5 & 6 Vict. c. 123	12 August 1842
An Act for amending, until the First Day of August One thousand eight hundred and forty-five, and until the End of the then next Session of Parliament, the Law relating to private Lunatic Asylums in Ireland. (Repealed by Mental Health Act (Northern Ireland) 1961 (c. 15 (N.I.)))

=== Local acts ===
Short title	Citation	Royal assent
Long title
Manchester Royal Infirmary Act 1842	5 & 6 Vict. c. i	22 April 1842
An Act to extend the Provisions of an Act of the Forty-eighth of King George the Third, (Note: Manchester Infirmary Act 1808 (48 Geo. 3. c. cxxvii)) relative to the Manchester Royal Infirmary, Dispensary, and Lunatic Hospital or Asylum; and to incorporate the Trustees thereof.
Midland Counties Railway Act 1842 (repealed)	5 & 6 Vict. c. ii	22 April 1842
An Act for altering and enlarging the Powers of the Acts relating to the Midland Counties Railway. (Repealed by Midland Railway Consolidation Act 1844 (7 & 8 Vict. c. xviii))
South Eastern Railway Act 1842	5 & 6 Vict. c. iii	22 April 1842
An Act to enable the South-eastern Railway Company to raise a further Sum of Money; and to amend the Acts relating to the said Railway.
Brandling Junction Railway Act 1842	5 & 6 Vict. c. iv	22 April 1842
An Act to authorize the Brandling Junction Railway Company to raise a further Sum of Money.
Birkenhead Improvement (Woodside Ferry) Act 1842 (repealed)	5 & 6 Vict. c. v	22 April 1842
An Act to authorize the Purchase of a certain Ferry called "Woodside Ferry" by the Commissioners for the Improvement of the Township or Chapelry of Birkenhead in the County Palatine of Chester; and for amending the Improvement Acts for the said Township. (Repealed by Birkenhead Corporation Act 1881 (44 & 45 Vict. c. cliii))
Bradford (Yorkshire) Water Act 1842 or the Bradford Waterworks Act 1842 (repealed)	5 & 6 Vict. c. vi	22 April 1842
An Act for better supplying with Water the Town and Neighbourhood of Bradford in the West Riding of the County of York. (Repealed by Bradford Waterworks Act 1854 (17 & 18 Vict. c. cxxiv) (Note: Incorrectly cited as "Bradford Waterworks 1854 (c.cxxxiv)" in the Chronological Table of Local Acts.))
Stalybridge Gas Act 1842 (repealed)	5 & 6 Vict. c. vii	22 April 1842
An Act for lighting with Gas the Town of Stalybridge, and the Neighbourhood thereof, in the Counties of Chester and Lancaster. (Repealed by Stalybridge Gas Act 1855 (18 & 19 Vict. c. viii))
Windsor Bridge Act 1842	5 & 6 Vict. c. viii	22 April 1842
An Act to continue and amend "An Act to rebuild Windsor Bridge in the Borough of New Windsor in the County of Berks, and to improve the Avenues thereto." (Note: Windsor Bridge and Approaches Act 1819 (59 Geo. 3. c. cxxvi))
Bristol Boundary Act 1842	5 & 6 Vict. c. ix	22 April 1842
An Act for restoring to the City and County of Bristol a Portion of the ancient Boundary of the same.
St. Pancras (Funeral Services Prohibition) Act 1842	5 & 6 Vict. c. x	22 April 1842
An Act for prohibiting Burying and Funeral Service in a Church or Chapel in the Parish of Saint Pancras in the County of Middlesex erected on the Estate of the Duke of Bedford.
Stirling, Dumbarton, Lanark and Perth Roads Act 1842	5 & 6 Vict. c. xi	22 April 1842
An Act to explain and amend an Act, intituled "An Act to make, alter, improve, and maintain certain Roads in the Counties of Stirling, Dumbarton, Lanark, and Perth;" (Note: Stirling, Dumbarton, Lanark and Perth Roads Act 1840 (3 & 4 Vict. c. ci)) and for making and maintaining certain new Roads in connexion therewith.
Edinburgh and Glasgow Railway Act 1842 (repealed)	5 & 6 Vict. c. xii	29 April 1842
An Act to amend the Acts relating to the Edinburgh and Glasgow Railway, and to grant further Powers to the Company of Proprietors thereof. (Repealed by Edinburgh and Glasgow Railway Consolidation Act 1852 (15 & 16 Vict. c. cix))
Nottingham Gas Act 1842 (repealed)	5 & 6 Vict. c. xiii	29 April 1842
An Act for granting more effectual Powers for lighting with Gas the Town of Nottingham, and several Parishes and Places adjacent thereto. (Repealed by Nottingham Gas Act 1853 (16 & 17 Vict. c. xi))
St. Austell Market Act 1842 (repealed)	5 & 6 Vict. c. xiv	29 April 1842
An Act for taking down the Market House in the Town of Saint Austell in the County of Cornwall, and for erecting a more convenient Market House instead thereof; for providing a new Market Place; and for increasing and regulating the Market and Fairs within the same Town. (Repealed by St. Austell Market Act 2008 (c. ii))
Bolton and Preston Railway Act 1842	5 & 6 Vict. c. xv	13 May 1842
An Act to facilitate the raising of Capital for the Completion of the Bolton and Preston Railway.
Birmingham and Derby Junction Railway Act 1842	5 & 6 Vict. c. xvi	13 May 1842
An Act to enable the Birmingham and Derby Junction Railway Company to raise a further Sum of Money.
Great North of England, Clarence and Hartlepool Junction Railway Act 1842	5 & 6 Vict. c. xvii	13 May 1842
An Act to alter, amend, extend, and enlarge the Powers and Provisions of an Act (Note: Great North of England, Clarence and Hartlepool Junction Railway Act 1837 (7 Will. 4 & 1 Vict. c. xcv)) relating to the Great North of England, Clarence, and Hartlepool Junction Railway in the County of Durham.
Sheffield, Ashton-under-Lyne and Manchester Railway Act 1842 (repealed)	5 & 6 Vict. c. xviii	13 May 1842
An Act to alter and amend some of the Provisions of the Act (Note: Sheffield, Ashton-under-Lyne and Manchester Railway Act 1837 (7 Will. 4 & 1 Vict. c. xxi)) relating to the Sheffield, Ashton-under-Lyne, and Manchester Railway. (Repealed by Manchester, Sheffield and Lincolnshire Railway Act 1849 (c.lxxxi))
Granton Pier Act 1842 (repealed)	5 & 6 Vict. c. xix	13 May 1842
An Act to extend the Provisions of an Act of the Seventh Year of the Reign of King William the Fourth, (Note: Granton Pier Act 1837 (7 Will. 4. & 1 Vict. c. xv)) relative to the Pier of Granton in the County of Edinburgh. (Repealed by Forth Ports Authority Order Confirmation Act 1969 (c. xxxiv))
Weston-super-Mare Improvement and Market Act 1842	5 & 6 Vict. c. xx	13 May 1842
An Act for paving, lighting, watching, cleansing, and otherwise improving the Town of Weston-super-Mare in the County of Somerset, and for establishing a Market therein.
North Coal Mining Company Act 1842	5 & 6 Vict. c. xxi	13 May 1842
An Act for regulating legal Proceedings by or against the Northern Coal Mining Company, for enabling the Company to appoint One Board of Directors in lieu of Two independent Boards, and for removing Restrictions in the Choice of Directors.
Great Torrington Market Act 1842	5 & 6 Vict. c. xxii	13 May 1842
An Act for erecting a Market House and for regulating the Market within the Borough and Town of Great Torrington in the County of Devon.
Cottenham, Rampton and Willingham Drainage Act 1842 (repealed)	5 & 6 Vict. c. xxiii	13 May 1842
An Act for draining certain Fen Lands and Low Grounds in the Parishes of Cottenham, Hampton, and Willingham, in the County of Cambridge. (Repealed by Great Ouse River Board (Old West Internal Drainage District) Order 1953 (SI 1953/1297))
Severn Navigation Act 1842	5 & 6 Vict. c. xxiv	13 May 1842
An Act for improving the Navigation of the Severn from the Entrance Lock of the Gloucester and Berkeley Canal, and from the Entrance Lock of the Herefordshire and Gloucestershire Canal, in the County of Gloucester, to Gladder or Whitehouse Brook in the County of Worcester.
Road from Glasgow to Redburn Bridge Act 1842	5 & 6 Vict. c. xxv	13 May 1842
An Act for maintaining and repairing the Road from Glasgow to Redburn Bridge, and a Branch Road leading therefrom.
Liverpool Paving and Sewerage Act 1842 (repealed)	5 & 6 Vict. c. xxvi	13 May 1842
An Act for amending an Act (Note: Liverpool Paving and Sewerage Act 1830 (11 Geo. 4 & 1 Will. 4. c. xv)) relating to the Paving and Sewerage of the Town of Liverpool in the County Palatine of Lancaster. (Repealed by Liverpool Sanitation Act 1846 (9 & 10 Vict. c. cxxvii))
Stanhope and Tyne Railroad Company (Dissolution) Act 1842	5 & 6 Vict. c. xxvii	13 May 1842
An Act to facilitate Arrangements consequent upon the Dissolution of the Stanhope and Tyne Railroad Company, and to incorporate some of the Proprietors, for the Purpose of continuing the working of a Part of the Railway belonging to the said Company.
Cheltenham and Great Western Union Railway Act 1842	5 & 6 Vict. c. xxviii	13 May 1842
An Act to amend Two Acts (Note: Cheltenham and Great Western Union Railway Act 1836 (6 & 7 Will. 4. c. lxxvii)) (Note: Cheltenham and Great Western Union Railway Act 1838 (1 & 2 Vict. c. xxiv)) relating to the Cheltenham and Great Western Union Railway.
Glasgow, Paisley, Kilmarnock and Ayr Railway Act 1842	5 & 6 Vict. c. xxix	13 May 1842
An Act to amend the Acts relating to the Glasgow, Paisley, Kilmarnock, and Ayr Railway, and to grant further Powers to the Company of Proprietors thereof.
Birmingham and Liverpool Junction Canal Navigation Act 1842 (repealed)	5 & 6 Vict. c. xxx	13 May 1842
An Act for granting further Powers to the Company of Proprietors of the Birmingham and Liverpool Junction Canal Navigation. (Repealed by Ellesmere and Chester Canal Company Act 1845 (8 & 9 Vict. c. ii))
Bristol Floating Dock Act 1842	5 & 6 Vict. c. xxxi	31 May 1842
An Act to repeal an Act passed in the Sixteenth Year of the Reign of His Majesty King George the Third, (Note: Bristol Dock Act 1776 (16 Geo. 3. c. 33)) for enlarging the Floating Dock within the Port of Bristol, and for other Works connected therewith.
Gosport Pier Act 1842	5 & 6 Vict. c. xxxii	31 May 1842
An Act for making a Pier at Gosport in the Parish of Alverstoke in the County of Southampton.
Ellesmere and Chester Canal Navigation Act 1842	5 & 6 Vict. c. xxxiii	31 May 1842
An Act to alter, amend, and enlarge the Powers and Provisions of the several Acts relating to the Ellesmere and Chester Canal Navigation.
London and Blackwall Railway Act 1842 or the London and Blackwall Navigation Act 1842	5 & 6 Vict. c. xxxiv	31 May 1842
An Act to alter, amend, and enlarge the Powers and Provisions of the Acts relating to the London and Blackwall Railway.
Saundersfoot Railway and Harbour (Extension and Branch Lines) Act 1842	5 & 6 Vict. c. xxxv	31 May 1842
An Act for authorizing the Saundersfoot Railway and Harbour Company to make an Extension of their present Railway, and also to make Two Branches from such Railway respectively within the County of Pembroke; and for extending the Provisions of the Act (Note: Saundersfoot Railway and Harbour Act 1829 (10 Geo. 4. c. cviii)) relating to the said Company.
Westminster Gas Act 1842	5 & 6 Vict. c. xxxvi	31 May 1842
An Act for incorporating the Equitable Gas Light Company, and for more effectually lighting with Gas certain Parishes and Places within the City and Liberty of Westminster, and the Western Parts of the Metropolis, and other Parishes and Places in the County of Middlesex.
Lanark, Stirling and Dumbarton Roads Act 1842	5 & 6 Vict. c. xxxvii	31 May 1842
An Act to improve, repair, and maintain certain Roads in the Counties of Lanark, Stirling, and Dumbarton; and to make and maintain a new Line of Road in connexion therewith.
Aberdeen, Banff and Kincardine Roads Act 1842 (repealed)	5 & 6 Vict. c. xxxviii	31 May 1842
An Act for more effectually maintaining and repairing certain Roads in the Counties of Aberdeen, Banff, and Kincardine, and for making certain new Roads in the said Counties, or some of them. (Repealed by Aberdeenshire Roads Act 1865 (28 & 29 Vict. c. ccxl))
Cwm Celyn and Blaina Iron Company Act 1842	5 & 6 Vict. c. xxxix	18 June 1842
An Act for regulating legal Proceedings by or against "The Cwm Celyn and Blaina Iron Company," and for granting certain Powers thereto.
Birmingham and Liverpool Junction Canal Navigation (No. 2) Act 1842	5 & 6 Vict. c. xl	18 June 1842
An Act for regulating the Communication between the Birmingham and Liverpool Junction Canal Navigation and the Staffordshire and Worcestershire Canal Navigation, and for amending the several Acts relating to such first-mentioned Canal Navigation.
Forth and Clyde Navigation Act 1842	5 & 6 Vict. c. xli	18 June 1842
An Act for altering and amending an Act of the Fourth and Fifth Year of Her present Majesty, intituled "An Act to consolidate, amend, and enlarge the Powers and Provisions of the several Acts relating to the Forth and Clyde Navigation;" (Note: Forth and Clyde Navigation Act 1841 (4 & 5 Vict. c. lv)) for enlarging and making Reservoirs for better supplying the said Navigation with Water; and for enabling the Company of Proprietors of the said Navigation to purchase and acquire the Forth and Cart Junction Canal.
Faversham Creek Navigation Act 1842 (repealed)	5 & 6 Vict. c. xlii	18 June 1842
An Act for improving the Navigation of Faversham Creek in the County of Kent. (Repealed by Medway Ports Authority Act 1973 (c. xxi))
St. Philip's Bridge Act 1842	5 & 6 Vict. c. xliii	18 June 1842
An Act to amend the Act (Note: St. Philip's Bridge (Bristol) Act 1838 (1 & 2 Vict. c. lxvi)) relating to the Saint Philips Bridge in the City and County of Bristol, and for widening and improving the Approaches to the said Bridge.
Liverpool Public Health and Buildings Act 1842 or the Liverpool Building Act 1842 (repealed)	5 & 6 Vict. c. xliv	18 June 1842
An Act for the Promotion of the Health of the Inhabitants of the Borough of Liverpool, and the better Regulation of Buildings in the said Borough. (Repealed by Liverpool Corporation Act 1921 (11 & 12 Geo. 5. c. lxxiv))
New Cross Turnpike Roads Amendment Act 1842	5 & 6 Vict. c. xlv	18 June 1842
An Act to alter some of the Provisions of an Act passed in the Seventh Year of the Reign of King George the Fourth, (Note: New Cross Turnpike Roads Act 1826 (7 Geo. 4. c. cxxv)) relating to the New Cross Turnpike Roads, in the Counties of Kent and Surrey.
Bristol and Gloucester Railway Act 1842	5 & 6 Vict. c. xlvi	18 June 1842
An Act for granting further Powers to the Bristol and Gloucester Railway Company.
Clerkenwell Green Streets Act 1842	5 & 6 Vict. c. xlvii	18 June 1842
An Act to alter and amend the Provisions of the Act (Note: Clerkenwell Green Street Act 1840 (3 & 4 Vict. c. cxii)) for opening a Street to Clerkenwell Green in the County of Middlesex.
Ely Place and Ely Mews Improvement Act 1842	5 & 6 Vict. c. xlviii	18 June 1842
An Act for paving, lighting, watching, cleansing, and improving Ely Place and Ely Mews, Holborn, in the County of Middlesex.
Fleetwood Improvement Act 1842 (repealed)	5 & 6 Vict. c. xlix	18 June 1842
An Act for paving, lighting, watching, cleansing, and otherwise improving the Town of Fleetwood and the Neighbourhood thereof in the County Palatine of Lancaster, and for establishing a Market therein. (Repealed by County of Lancashire Act 1984 (c. xxi))
Camberwell and Peckham Lighting and Watching Act 1842 (repealed)	5 & 6 Vict. c. l	18 June 1842
An Act to alter and amend an Act of the Fifty-fourth Year of the Reign of His Majesty King George the Third, (Note: Camberwell and Peckham Lighting and Watching Act 1814 (54 Geo. 3. c. ccxiii)) for lighting and watching certain Parts of the Liberties, Hamlets, or Districts of Camberwell and Peckham in the County of Surrey. (Repealed by London Government (Borough of Camberwell) Order in Council 1901 (SR&O 1901/213))
St. Pancras Streets Act 1842 (repealed)	5 & 6 Vict. c. li	18 June 1842
An Act to explain an Act passed in the Fourth and Fifth Years of the Reign of Her present Majesty, intituled "An Act to alter, amend, and enlarge some of the Powers and Provisions of the Acts for paving and otherwise improving certain Streets in the Parish of Saint Pancras in the County of Middlesex." (Note: St. Pancras Streets Act 1841 (4 & 5 Vict. c. lxv)) (Repealed by London Government (Borough of St. Pancras) Order in Council 1901 (SR&O 1901/274))
Liverpool Borough Court Act 1842 (repealed)	5 & 6 Vict. c. lii	18 June 1842
An Act to restrict the vexatious Removal of certain Actions from the Borough Court of Liverpool. (Repealed by Liverpool Corporation Act 1921 (11 & 12 Geo. 5. c. lxxiv))
Saundersfoot Floating Dock Act 1842	5 & 6 Vict. c. liii	18 June 1842
An Act for enabling the Saundersfoot Railway and Harbour Company to make a Floating Dock at Saundersfoot in the County of Pembroke, and for extending the Provisions of the Act relating to the said Company with reference to the said Harbour.
Greenock Harbours Act 1842	5 & 6 Vict. c. liv	18 June 1842
An Act for further improving, enlarging, and maintaining the Harbours of the Town of Greenock.
River Welland Dues Act 1842	5 & 6 Vict. c. lv	18 June 1842
An Act for transferring to the Trustees of the River Welland in the County of Lincoln certain Dues payable in respect of Vessels using the said River, Part of the Port and Harbour of Boston, and their Cargoes, for better effecting Improvements authorised by a former Act; (Note: Boston Port and Harbour Act 1834 (4 & 5 Will. 4. c. lxxxvii)) and for amending several Acts relating to the same.
Drogheda Port and Harbour Act 1842	5 & 6 Vict. c. lvi	18 June 1842
An Act for the Improvement of the Port and Harbour of Drogheda.
Warkworth Harbour Act 1842 (repealed)	5 & 6 Vict. c. lvii	18 June 1842
An Act to explain and amend the Powers and Provisions of the Act (Note: Warkworth Harbour Act 1837 (7 Will. 4 & 1 Vict. c. lxxvii)) relating to the Warkworth Harbour in the County of Northumberland. (Repealed by Warkworth Harbour Act 1847 (10 & 11 Vict. c. cxxviii))
Gravesend Town, Quay and Pier Act 1842	5 & 6 Vict. c. lviii	18 June 1842
An Act for amending the Acts relating to the Gravesend Town Quay and Pier.
Gravesend Royal Terrace Garden Pier Act 1842	5 & 6 Vict. c. lix	18 June 1842
An Act for erecting a Pier at the Royal Terrace Gardens in the Town of Gravesend in the County of Kent.
Boston Port and Harbour Act 1842	5 & 6 Vict. c. lx	18 June 1842
An Act for amending the several Acts relating to the Port and Harbour of Boston in the County of Lincoln.
Kingstown Episcopal Mariners Church Act 1842	5 & 6 Vict. c. lxi	18 June 1842
An Act for authorizing the Conveyance of a Piece of Land upon which a Church at Kingstown in the County and Diocese of Dublin and Parish of Monkstown has been erected, and for providing for the due Celebration of Divine Service in the said Church, and for assigning a District thereto.
Ardrossan Harbour Improvement Act 1842 (repealed)	5 & 6 Vict. c. lxii	18 June 1842
An Act to amend an Act for erecting a Harbour at Ardrossan in the County of Ayr, and to provide for the Improvement of the said Harbour. (Repealed by Ardrossan Harbour Consolidation Act 1864 (27 & 28 Vict. c. ccviii))
Tyne Fisheries Act 1842 (repealed)	5 & 6 Vict. c. lxiii	18 June 1842
An Act for regulating and maintaining the Fisheries in the River Tyne. (Repealed by Salmon Fishery Act 1861 (24 & 25 Vict. c. 109))
Guarantee Society Act 1842	5 & 6 Vict. c. lxiv	18 June 1842
An Act for regulating legal Proceedings by or against "The Guarantee Society," and for granting certain Powers thereto.
City of Glasgow Life Assurance and Reversionary Company Act 1842 (repealed)	5 & 6 Vict. c. lxv	18 June 1842
An Act to enable the City of Glasgow Life Assurance and Reversionary Company to sue and be sued; and for other Purposes relating to the said Company. (Repealed by City of Glasgow Life Assurance Company's Act 1861 (24 & 25 Vict. c. cxlv))
Imperial Insurance Company Act 1842	5 & 6 Vict. c. lxvi	18 June 1842
An Act to enable "The Imperial Insurance Company" to alter some of the Provisions of their Deed of Settlement, and better regulate their Proceedings and the Investment of their Funds.
Indemnity Mutual Marine Insurance Company Act 1842	5 & 6 Vict. c. lxvii	18 June 1842
An Act for regulating legal Proceedings by or against "The Indemnity Mutual Marine Assurance Company."
Holywell Turnpike Roads Act 1842	5 & 6 Vict. c. lxviii	18 June 1842
An Act to alter, amend, and enlarge the Powers and Provisions of an Act (Note: Flint, Holywell and Mostyn Districts of Road Act 1833 (3 & 4 Will. 4. c. xxv)) relating to the Holywell District of Turnpike Roads in the County of Flint, and for making new Roads to communicate therewith.
Market Harborough and Brampton Road Amendment Act 1842	5 & 6 Vict. c. lxix	18 June 1842
An Act to amend the Provisions of an Act passed in the Fourth and Fifth Years of the Reign of Her present Majesty, intituled "An Act for more effectually repairing and improving the Road from Market Harborough in the County of Leicester to Brampton in the County of Huntingdon." (Note: Road from Market Harborough to Brampton (Huntingdonshire) Road Act 1841 (4 & 5 Vict. c. xxxv))
Roads from Leicester to Narborough and to Hinckley Act 1842	5 & 6 Vict. c. lxx	18 June 1842
An Act for more effectually repairing the Roads from the Borough of Leicester to Narborough, and from the said Borough of Leicester to Earl Shilton, and from Earl Shilton to Hinckley, all in the County of Leicester.
Lincoln Roads Amendment Act 1842	5 & 6 Vict. c. lxxi	18 June 1842
An Act to explain and amend an Act passed in the Fourth and Fifth Years of the Reign of Her present Majesty, (Note: Lincoln Roads Act 1841 (4 & 5 Vict. c. cviii)) for more effectually repairing, maintaining, and improving certain Roads leading to and from the City of Lincoln.
Church Stretton and Longden Roads (Salop.) Act 1842	5 & 6 Vict. c. lxxii	18 June 1842
An Act for maintaining certain Roads in the County of Salop called The Church Stretton and Longden Roads.
Bolton and Westhoughton Road Act 1842	5 & 6 Vict. c. lxxiii	18 June 1842
An Act for more effectually repairing the Road from Bolton to Westhoughton in the County Palatine of Lancaster.
Leicester and Ashby-de-la-Zouch Road Act 1842	5 & 6 Vict. c. lxxiv	18 June 1842
An Act for more effectually repairing the Road from the Borough of Leicester in the County of Leicester to the Town of Ashbyde-la-Zouch in the said County.
Stonehaven and Cobleheugh Road (Slug Mount) Act 1842	5 & 6 Vict. c. lxxv	18 June 1842
An Act to alter and amend the Acts for making, repairing, and keeping in repair the Road from Stonehaven, through the Slug Mount, to the Bridge at Cobleheugh, in the County of Kincardine.
Dundalk and Bannbridge Road Act 1842 (repealed)	5 & 6 Vict. c. lxxvi	18 June 1842
An Act to amend an Act of His late Majesty King George the Fourth, (Note: Newry and Bannbridge Road Act 1821 (1 & 2 Geo. 4. c. cvi)) for repairing the Road from Dundalk in the County of Louth to Bannbridge in the County of Down, so far as relates to the Southern Division of the said Road. (Repealed by Turnpike Trusts Abolition (Ireland) Act 1857 (20 & 21 Vict. c. 16))
Kington Roads (Herefordshire) Act 1842	5 & 6 Vict. c. lxxvii	18 June 1842
An Act for repairing and maintaining several Roads leading from the Town of Kington, and other Roads branching therefrom, in the County of Hereford.
Brentford Gas Act 1842	5 & 6 Vict. c. lxxviii	18 June 1842
An Act to amend and enlarge the Powers of an Act passed in the Second Year of the Reign of His Majesty King George the Fourth, (Note: Brentford Gas Act 1821 (1 & 2 Geo. 4. c. lxix)) for supplying the Towns of Old and New Brentford in the County of Middlesex, and other Places therein mentioned, with Gas; and to raise a further Sum of Money for carrying on the said Undertaking.
South Metropolitan Gas Light and Coke Company Act 1842	5 & 6 Vict. c. lxxix	18 June 1842
An Act for incorporating the South Metropolitan Gas Light and Coke Company, and for more effectually lighting with Gas certain Places within the Borough of Southwark, and other Parishes and Places in the Counties of Surrey and Kent.
Newcastle and Darlington Junction Railway Act 1842	5 & 6 Vict. c. lxxx	18 June 1842
An Act for completing the Railway Communication between the Towns of Newcastle-on-Tyne and Darlington, by a Railway to be called the Newcastle and Darlington Junction Railway, with a Branch to the City of Durham.
Warwick and Leamington Union Railway Act 1842	5 & 6 Vict. c. lxxxi	18 June 1842
An Act for making a Branch Railway from the London and Birmingham Railway at Coventry to communicate with the Towns of Warwick and Leamington in the County of Warwick.
Yarmouth and Norwich Railway Act 1842 (repealed)	5 & 6 Vict. c. lxxxii	18 June 1842
An Act for making a Railway from Great Yarmouth to Norwich in the County of Norfolk. (Repealed by Norfolk Railway Act 1845 (8 & 9 Vict. c. xli))
Dundee and Arbroath Railway Act 1842	5 & 6 Vict. c. lxxxiii	18 June 1842
An Act for enabling the Dundee and Arbroath Railway Company to raise a further Sum of Money, and to amend the Provisions of the Act (Note: Dundee and Arbroath Railway Act 1836 (6 & 7 Will. 4 c. xxxii)) relating to the said Railway.
Great North of England Railway Act 1842	5 & 6 Vict. c. lxxxiv	18 June 1842
An Act for the Abandonment of a Portion of the Line of the Great North of England Railway, and for altering and amending the Acts relating thereto.
Metropolitan Patent Wood Paving Company Act 1842	5 & 6 Vict. c. lxxxv	22 June 1842
An Act for regulating legal Proceedings by or against "The Metropolitan Patent Wood Paving Company," and for granting certain Powers thereto.
Ferrybridge and Boroughbridge Road Act 1842	5 & 6 Vict. c. lxxxvi	22 June 1842
An Act for repairing, improving, and maintaining the Road leading from Ferrybridge, through Wetherby, to Boroughbridge in the County of York.
Sudbury (Suffolk) Improvement Act 1842	5 & 6 Vict. c. lxxxvii	30 June 1842
An Act to amend, alter, and enlarge the Powers and Provisions of an Act (Note: Sudbury (Suffolk) Improvement Act 1825 (6 Geo. 4. c. lxx)) for paving, lighting, cleansing, watching, watering, and improving the Town and Borough of Sudbury in the County of Suffolk.
Liverpool Poor Laws Act 1842 (repealed)	5 & 6 Vict. c. lxxxviii	30 June 1842
An Act for the Administration of the Laws relating to the Poor in the Parish of Liverpool in the County of Lancaster. (Repealed by Liverpool Corporation Act 1921 (11 & 12 Geo. 5. c. lxxiv))
Thames Haven Dock and Railway Act 1842 (repealed)	5 & 6 Vict. c. lxxxix	30 June 1842
An Act for extending and enlarging some of the Provisions of an Act (Note: Thames Haven, Dock and Railway Act 1836 (6 & 7 Will. 4. c. cviii)) relating to the Thames Haven Dock and Railway. (Repealed by Thames Haven Dock Company's Act 1856 (19 & 20 Vict. c. cxix))
Stockton and Hartlepool Railway Act 1842 (repealed)	5 & 6 Vict. c. xc	30 June 1842
An Act for the maintaining and better regulating of the Stockton and Hartlepool Railway, and for incorporating the Proprietors thereof. (Repealed by West Hartlepool Harbour and Railway Act 1852 (15 & 16 Vict. c. cxlii))
Burntisland Pier, Ferry and Road Act 1842 (repealed)	5 & 6 Vict. c. xci	30 June 1842
An Act for constructing a Low-water Pier and necessary Works at Burntisland in the County of Fife, and establishing a Ferry between the same and Granton in the County of Edinburgh, and for improving the Communication between the said Pier and Kinghorn. (Repealed by Forth Ports Authority Order Confirmation Act 1969 (c. xxxiv))
Athy and Castlecomer Road Act 1842 (repealed)	5 & 6 Vict. c. xcii	30 June 1842
An Act to amend an Act passed in the First and Second Year of the Reign of His Majesty King George the Fourth, (Note: Athy and Kilkenny, Castlecomer and Leighlin Bridge, and Carlow and Castlecomer Roads Act 1821 (1 & 2 Geo. 4. c. xxxviii)) for repairing the Road from the Town of Athy in the County of Kildare, through the Town of Castlecomer in the County of Kilkenny to the City of Kilkenny, and from the Town of Castlecomer to the Town of Leighlin Bridge in the County of Carlow, and from the Town of Carlow to the said Town of Castlecomer, so far as relates to the Second Division of the said Road. (Repealed by Turnpike Trusts Abolition (Ireland) Act 1857 (20 & 21 Vict. c. 16))
Tadcaster and Otley Road Act 1842	5 & 6 Vict. c. xciii	30 June 1842
An Act for repairing and improving the Road from Tadcaster to Otley in the West Riding of the County of York.
Bromyard Roads (Herefordshire and Worcestershire) Act 1842	5 & 6 Vict. c. xciv	30 June 1842
An Act for repairing and maintaining several Roads leading from the Town of Bromyard in the County of Hereford, and other Roads adjoining thereto in the said County and in the County d Worcester, and for making several new Lines of Road connected therewith in the same Counties.
Stourbridge Roads Act 1842	5 & 6 Vict. c. xcv	30 June 1842
An Act for repairing the several Roads leading to and from the Market House in Stourbridge in the County of Worcester, and several other Roads connected with the said Roads in the Counties of Worcester, Stafford, and Salop.
North American Colonial Association of Ireland Act 1842	5 & 6 Vict. c. xcvi	1 July 1842
An Act to amend an Act for incorporating and granting certain Powers to the North American Colonial Association of Ireland, and for explaining, altering, and enlarging the Provisions thereof.
Deptford Pier Act 1842	5 & 6 Vict. c. xcvii	9 July 1842
An Act to alter and amend the Powers and Provisions of the Acts relating to the making and maintaining of a Pier and other Works at Deptford in the County of Kent.
Ross and Cromarty Court House Accommodation Act 1842	5 & 6 Vict. c. xcviii	9 July 1842
An Act to enable the Sheriffdom of Boss and Cromarty to provide proper Court House Accommodations, and for other Purposes relative thereto.
Forth Marine Insurance Company Act 1842	5 & 6 Vict. c. xcix	9 July 1842
An Act to enable the "Forth Marine Insurance Company" to sue and be sued, and for other Purposes.
Finnington and Chorley Turnpike Act 1842	5 & 6 Vict. c. c	9 July 1842
An Act for making and maintaining as Turnpike the Road leading from the Preston and Blackburn Turnpike Road at Finnington in the Township of Chorley in the County of Lancaster.
London (City) and Middlesex Roads Act 1842	5 & 6 Vict. c. ci	16 July 1842
An Act for further extending the Approaches to London Bridge and the Avenues adjoining to the Royal Exchange in the City of London, and for amending the Acts relating thereto respectively; and for raising a Sum of Money towards opening a Street to Clerkenwell Green in the County of Middlesex in continuation of the new Street from Farringdon Street in the City of London.
London and Greenwich Railway Act 1842	5 & 6 Vict. c. cii	16 July 1842
An Act for amending some of the Powers of the Acts relating to the London and Greenwich Railway.
Leeds Burial Grounds Act 1842 (repealed)	5 & 6 Vict. c. ciii	16 July 1842
An Act for providing additional Burial Grounds in the Parish of Leeds in the West Riding of the County of York. (Repealed by Leeds Corporation (Consolidation) Act 1905 (5 Edw. 7. c. i))
Leeds Improvement Act 1842 (repealed)	5 & 6 Vict. c. civ	16 July 1842
An Act for better lighting, cleansing, sewering, and improving the Borough of Leeds in the County of York. (Repealed by Leeds Corporation (Consolidation) Act 1905 (5 Edw. 7. c. i))
Toxteth Park, Streets and Sewerage Act 1842 (repealed)	5 & 6 Vict. c. cv	16 July 1842
An Act for better paving and improving the Streets and Highways within the Extra-parochial Place of Toxteth Park in the County Palatine of Lancaster, and for the Sewerage of certain Parts of the said Place. (Repealed by Liverpool Corporation Act 1921 (11 & 12 Geo. 5. c. lxxiv))
Liverpool Improvement Act 1842 (repealed)	5 & 6 Vict. c. cvi	16 July 1842
An Act for the Improvement, good Government, and Police Regulation of the Borough of Liverpool. (Repealed by Liverpool Corporation Act 1921 (11 & 12 Geo. 5. c. lxxiv))
Southwark (St. George the Martyr) Improvement Act 1842	5 & 6 Vict. c. cvii	30 July 1842
An Act for making a new Street from Blackman Street to the Southwark Bridge Road, and for improving the District called the Mint, all in the Parish of Saint George the Martyr in the Borough of Southwark in the County of Surrey.
Liverpool and Manchester Railway Act 1842 (repealed)	5 & 6 Vict. c. cviii	30 July 1842
An Act for better enabling The Liverpool and Manchester Railway Company to extend the Line of the said Railway, and for amending and enlarging the Powers and Provisions of the several Acts relating to such Railway. (Repealed by Grand Junction Railway Act 1845 (8 & 9 Vict. c. cxcviii))
Reading Cemetery Company Act 1842 (repealed)	5 & 6 Vict. c. cix	30 July 1842
An Act for establishing a General Cemetery for the Interment of the Dead in the Parish of Sonning, near the Town of Readme in the County of Berks. (Repealed by Berkshire Act 1986 (c. ii))
Mersey Navigation Act 1842	5 & 6 Vict. c. cx	30 July 1842
An Act for better preserving the Navigation of the River Mersey.
Wicklow Harbour Act 1842	5 & 6 Vict. c. cxi	30 July 1842
An Act for making and maintaining and improving a Harbour at Wicklow in the County of Wicklow.
Roads in Lanark, Ayr and Renfrew and Dalmarnock Bridge Act 1842	5 & 6 Vict. c. cxii	30 July 1842
An Act for maintaining and improving certain Roads in the Counties of Lanark, Ayr, and Renfrew; for maintaining a Bridge over the River Clyde at Dalmarnock, and for other Purposes connected therewith.
Imperial Bank of England Act 1842	5 & 6 Vict. c. cxiii	10 August 1842
An Act to enable the Court of Chancery to appoint a Person or Persons to sue on behalf of the Copartnership of Bankers lately carrying on Business under the Firm of "The Imperial Bank of England," in lieu of the Public Officer.

=== Private acts ===
Short title	Citation	Royal assent
Long title
Clee Inclosure Act 1842 or the Cleethorpes Inclosure Act 1842 (repealed)	5 & 6 Vict. c. 1 Pr.	22 April 1842
An Act for inclosing Lands in the Parish of Clee in the County of Lincoln. (Repealed by Humberside Act 1982 (c. iii))
Wakeyhill Inclosure Act 1842	5 & 6 Vict. c. 2 Pr.	22 April 1842
An Act for inclosing and dividing Wakeyhill Common in the Parish of Stapleton in the County of Cumberland.
Cottenham Inclosure Act 1842	5 & 6 Vict. c. 3 Pr.	22 April 1842
An Act for inclosing Lands in the Parish of Cottenham in the County of Cambridge.
Witts's Estate Act 1842	5 & 6 Vict. c. 4 Pr.	13 May 1842
An Act for vesting certain Freehold Messuages, Fee Farm Rents, and Hereditaments, respectively situate and arising in the City of London, devised and settled by the Will of Broome Witts Esquire, deceased, in Trustees, for Sale, and for laying oat the Monies to be produced by such Sale in the Purchase of other Estates, to be settled in the same Manner; and also for enabling the Trustees, as to some of such Messuages and Hereditaments, in the meantime, and until Sale thereof, to grant Leases thereof for the Term of Twenty-one Years, or, in order that the same may be repaired, rebuilt, or improved, for a longer Period.
Kingsclere Inclosure Act 1842	5 & 6 Vict. c. 5 Pr.	13 May 1842
An Act for inclosing Lands in the Parish of Kingsclere in the County of Southampton.
Buckland Inclosure Act 1842	5 & 6 Vict. c. 6 Pr.	13 May 1842
An Act for inclosing Lands in the Parish of Buckland in the County of Buckingham.
Huish, Champflower, &c. Inclosure Act 1842	5 & 6 Vict. c. 7 Pr.	31 May 1842
An Act for inclosing Lands in the several Parishes of Huish, Champflower, Clatworthy, and Brampton Ralph in the County of Somerset.
Yate Inclosure Act 1842	5 & 6 Vict. c. 8 Pr.	18 June 1842
An Act for inclosing Lands in the Parish of Yate in the County of Gloucester.
Ormesby Inclosure Act 1842	5 & 6 Vict. c. 9 Pr.	18 June 1842
An Act for dividing, allotting, and inclosing Lands in the Parishes of Ormesby Saint Margaret, Ormesby Saint Michael, Ormesby Saint Peter, and Ormesby Saint Andrew, and Scratby otherwise Scroteby, in the County of Norfolk.
Medbourn Inclosure Act 1842	5 & 6 Vict. c. 10 Pr.	18 June 1842
An Act for inclosing Lands in the Parish of Medbourn in the County of Leicester.
Cass's Estate Act 1842	5 & 6 Vict. c. 11 Pr.	18 June 1842
An Act to enable the Trustees of Estates held upon charitable Trusts under the Will of Sir John Cass Knight, deceased, to make Sale of Part of the said Estates.
Charterhouse Hospital Estate Act 1842	5 & 6 Vict. c. 12 Pr.	22 June 1842
An Act to enable the Governors of the Hospital of King Jama founded in Charterhouse to endow the Perpetual Curacy of Hartland in the County of Devon with a fixed Provision out of the Tithes of the Rectory of Hartland aforesaid, in substitution of their present Obligation, and to sell the Right of Presentation to the said Curacy, and the said Rectory and Tithes, and also certain Lands at Hartland aforesaid, and to invest the Monies arising from such Sales in the Purchase of other Lands, for the Benefit of the said Hospital.
Britwell Inclosure Act 1842	5 & 6 Vict. c. 13 Pr.	22 June 1842
An Act for inclosing Lands in the Parishes of Britwell Salome and Britwell Prior in the County of Oxford.
Kilmington Inclosure Act 1842	5 & 6 Vict. c. 14 Pr.	22 June 1842
An Act for inclosing Lands in the Parish of Kilmtngton in the County of Devon.
Bathurst's Estates Act 1842	5 & 6 Vict. c. 15 Pr.	30 June 1842
An Act for carrying into effect a Partition of and other Arrangements respecting Estates in the County of Southampton of Sir Frederick Hutchison Hervey Bathurst Baronet and Louisa Mary his late Wife, and of the Honourable Charlotte Georgina Harriet Craven Widow.
Duke of Argyll's Estate Act 1842	5 & 6 Vict. c. 16 Pr.	30 June 1842
An Act to alter and amend Two Acts of the Eleventh of King George the Fourth, (Note: Duke of Argyll's Estate Act 1830 (11 Geo. 4 & 1 Will. 4. c. 35 Pr.)) and Seventh of His late Majesty, (Note: Duke of Argyll's Estate Act 1837 (7 Will. 4 & 1 Vict. c. 16 Pr.)) in regard to the Estates of Argyll; and to enable John Douglas Edward Henry, the present Duke of Argyll, to borrow a further Sum of Money, and to make the same a Charge on the said Estates; and for other Purposes.
Manners's Estate Act 1842	5 & 6 Vict. c. 17 Pr.	9 July 1842
An Act for vesting certain Estates appointed and devised by the Will of George Manners Esquire, deceased, and purchased under the Trusts thereof, in Trustees to sell the same, and to invest the Monies thence arising in the Purchase of other Estates, to be settled to the same Uses.
Brewood School Estate Act 1842	5 & 6 Vict. c. 18 Pr.	9 July 1842
An Act for empowering the Trustees of Brewood Grammar School in the County of Stafford to make Sales and to grant Mining Leases of certain Parts of the Estates belonging to the said School, and for other Purposes therein mentioned.
York Cathedral Act 1842	5 & 6 Vict. c. 19 Pr.	9 July 1842
An Act for enabling the Dean and Chapter of the Cathedral and Metropolitical Church of Saint Peter of York to raise Money for the Discharge of Debts, and for effecting the Restoration and Repair of the said Cathedral Church.
Patterson's Estate Act 1842	5 & 6 Vict. c. 20 Pr.	16 July 1842
An Act for selling the Entailed Estate of Monkwood in the County of Ayr, belonging to William Paterson Esquire, and investing the Price in the Purchase of other Lands, to be entailed in lieu thereof.
Davidson's Estate Act 1842	5 & 6 Vict. c. 21 Pr.	16 July 1842
An Act to enable Duncan Davidson Esquire of Tullock to execute a new Entail of his Lands and Estates of Tulloch, for the Purpose of rectifying a Mistake in a former Entail thereof; and for vesting Parts of these Lands and Estates in Trustees, for relieving the said Duncan Davidson of Sums laid out in improving, the same; and for certain other Uses and Purposes.
Duke of Cleveland's Estate Act 1842	5 & 6 Vict. c. 22 Pr.	16 July 1842
An Act to enable the Trustees of the Will of the late Duke of Cleveland to grant Mining, Building, and other Leases of the Trust Estates in the County of Durham devised by the Will of the Duke of Cleveland, and to sell or exchange Parts of the same Estates.
Viscount Fitzwilliam's Estate Act 1842	5 & 6 Vict. c. 23 Pr.	16 July 1842
An Act for granting further Power to lease Parts of the Estates devised by the Will of Richard late Viscount Fitzwilliam deceased, situate in the City of Dublin and the Neighbourhood thereof, and for authorizing the Sale of certain Fee Farm and other Rents, also devised by that Will.
Earl of Devon's Estate Act 1842	5 & 6 Vict. c. 24 Pr.	30 July 1842
An Act for authorizing the raising, by Mortgage of the Estates devised by the Will of the Right Honourable William late Earl of Devon, a limited Sum of Money, to be applied, under the Direction of the High Court of Chancery, in repaying to the present Earl and Lord Courtenay the whole or a Portion of the Monies already expended by them for the Repair and Restoration of the Castle of Powderham and the Buildings belonging thereto, and towards completing such Repair and Restoration; and for making Provision for Payment of the Interest of the Money so to be raised, and also for the Liquidation of the Principal; also for extending the Power to grant Building Leases contained in the Will of the said late Earl.
Lord Sherborne's Estate Act 1842	5 & 6 Vict. c. 25 Pr.	30 July 1842
An Act for discharging the Borough, Hundred, and Manor of Cheltenham in the County of Gloucester, and other Estates n the same County, from the Portions of the younger Children of the Right Honourable John Lord Sherborne, and the younger Children of the Honourable James Henry Legge Dutton, and from the Terms created for raising the same.
Gibson's Estate Act 1842	5 & 6 Vict. c. 26 Pr.	30 July 1842
An Act for effecting a Partition, Division, or Allotment of Estates in the Counties of York, Suffolk, and Essex, devised by the Will of Atkinson Francis Gibson, late of Saffron Walden in the County of Essex, Brewer, deceased.
Pilkington's (Swinnerton's) Will Act 1842	5 & 6 Vict. c. 27 Pr.	30 July 1842
An Act for carrying into effect certain Provisions contained in the Will of Thomas Swinnerton Esquire, deceased, relative to the building of a Mansion House on the Testator's Estate at Butterton in the County of Stafford, and building a Church or Chapel on the said Estate; and for other Purposes.
Lord Lorton's (Countess of Rosse's) Estate Act 1842	5 & 6 Vict. c. 28 Pr.	30 July 1842
An Act for authorizing the Sale of Portions of the Real Estate devised by the Will of Jane Countess Dowager Rosse deceased, and for the Purchase of other Estates to be settled to the Uses of the said Will; and for the authorizing the granting of Fanning and Building Leases of the same Estates.
Calland's Estate Act 1842	5 & 6 Vict. c. 29 Pr.	30 July 1842
An Act for better enabling the Trustees of the Will of the late Charles Calland Esquire to grant Building and Farming and Mining and other Leases of certain Estates situate in the County of Glamorgan, devised by the said Will, and to sell certain Portions of the same Estates, and for laying out the Monies arising from such Sales in the Purchase of other Lands, to be settled to the same Uses; and for other Purposes.
Duke of Bridgewater's Estate Act 1842	5 & 6 Vict. c. 30 Pr.	30 July 1842
An Act to enable the Trustees of the Will of the Most Noble Francis late Duke of Bridgewater to raise Money for rebuilding Bridgewater House, and for repairing and improving the Bridgewater Canal; and for other Purposes.
Lord Southampton's Estate Act 1842	5 & 6 Vict. c. 31 Pr.	30 July 1842
An Act to extend a Power of Leasing contained in the Marriage Settlement of Charles Lord Southampton and Harriet Lady Southampton his Wife.
Mostyn's Estate Act 1842	5 & 6 Vict. c. 32 Pr.	30 July 1842
An Act for vesting Parts of the Settled Estates of the Honourable Edward Mostyn Lloyd Mostyn of Mostyn in the County of Flint in Trustees, upon Trust to sell, mortgage, or exchange the same, and to lay out the Monies to arise therefrom in the Payment of Debts, Charges, and Mortgages upon or affecting the same, or other Estates settled to the same Uses, or in the Purchase of other Estates, to be settled to the same Uses; and for other Purposes.
Marquis of Tweeddale's Estate Act 1842	5 & 6 Vict. c. 33 Pr.	30 July 1842
An Act to enable George Marquis of Tweeddale to borrow a certain Sum of Money upon the Security of his Entailed Estates, for Repayment to him of a Portion of the Monies laid out by him in the Improvement of these Estates.
Bishop of Derry's Estate Act 1842	5 & 6 Vict. c. 34 Pr.	30 July 1842
An Act for confirming certain Conveyances in Perpetuity made by the Ecclesiastical Commissioners for Ireland and the present Bishop of Derry and Raphoe of Parts of the Mensal Lands of the See of Derry, and for confirming certain Leases made by the same Bishop and his immediate Predecessor in the See of Derry of other Parts of the Mensal Lands of the same See; also for enabling the Bishop of Derry and Raphoe for the Time being to grant Leases of the Parts last mentioned, and certain other Parts of the Mensal Lands of the See of Derry; and for other Purposes.
King Edward VI Grammar School Birmingham Act 1842 (repealed)	5 & 6 Vict. c. 35 Pr.	30 July 1842
An Act to extend the Provisions of Two Acts, of the Second Year of King William the Fourth (Note: King Edward VI's Free Grammar School Act 1831 (1 & 2 Will. 4. c. 17)) and the First Year of Her present Majesty, (Note: King Edward VI Free Grammar School Birmingham Act 1837 (7 Will. 4 & 1 Vict. c. 41)) relating to the Free Grammar School of King Edward the Sixth in Birmingham in the County of Warwick. (Repealed by Birmingham (King Edward the Sixth) School Act 1900 (63 & 64 Vict. c. lxiv))
Crawfurd's Estate Act 1842	5 & 6 Vict. c. 36 Pr.	5 August 1842
An Act to enable William Stuart Stirling Crawfurd Esquire, the Heir in possession of the Entail Estate of Milton in the County of Lanark, and his Successors, to grant Feu Rights thereof.
Duke of Buckingham's Estate Act 1842	5 & 6 Vict. c. 37 Pr.	5 August 1842
An Act for enabling the Most Noble Richard Plantagenet Grenville Nugent Chandos Temple Duke of Buckingham and Chandos to grant Underleases of Lands situate in or near the Town of Ryde in the Isle of Wight, and to authorize the granting of Leases of other Lands situate in or near the same Place, belonging to Elizabeth Lydia Lind and others.
Lord Dinorben's Estate Act 1842	5 & 6 Vict. c. 38 Pr.	5 August 1842
An Act to enable the Right Honourable William Lewis Lord Dinorben, by Mortgage of certain Hereditaments devised to him for Life with Remainders over by the Will and Codicils of the Reverend Edward Hughes, to raise not exceeding Twenty thousand Pounds at Interest, for rebuilding the Mansion and Offices at Kinmel Park, devised by the said Will and Codicils to the same Uses; and for other Purposes.
Cauvin's Hospital Edinburgh Act 1842	5 & 6 Vict. c. 39 Pr.	10 August 1842
An Act to amend and explain the Act passed in the Seventh sad Eighth Years of His late Majesty George the Fourth, Chapter 11, intituled "An Act to explain and modify the Trust Settlement of the late Louis Cauvin, for the Endowment and Maintenance if an Hospital for the Support and Education of Boys;" (Note: Cauvin's Hospital Edinburgh Act 1827 (7 & 8 Geo. 4. c. 11 Pr.)) and further to explain and modify the said Trust Settlement.
Hele's Charity (Lowe's) Estate Act 1842	5 & 6 Vict. c. 40 Pr.	10 August 1842
An Act for enabling the Trustees for the Time being of Hele's Charity Estates to grant Leases for absolute Terms, not exceeding Twenty-one Years, of certain Estates vested in them as such Trustees, and situate in the Parishes of Clist Saint Lawrence, Broadclyst, Stokeinteignhead, Bovey Tracey, and Newton Pervert, in the County of Devon; and for confirming certain Leases of Parts of such Estates already granted, and for fixing the Proportions in which the Rents reserved and to be reserved by such Leases, and such other Profits of the said Estates as have accrued and shall accrue after the granting of such Leases thereof respectively shall be divided and enjoyed; and for other Purposes.
Henry Mitford's Divorce Act 1842 (Note: This act was not printed by the Queen's Printer.)	5 & 6 Vict. c. 41 Pr.	23 March 1842
An Act to dissolve the Marriage of Henry Reveley Mitford Esquire with the Right Honourable Lady Georgina Jemima Mitford his now Wife, and to enable him to marry again; and for other Purposes.
Bunsen's Naturalization Act 1842	5 & 6 Vict. c. 42 Pr.	22 April 1842
An Act for naturalizing the Reverend Henry George Bunsen.
Liebert's Naturalization Act 1842	5 & 6 Vict. c. 43 Pr.	22 April 1842
An Act for naturalizing Bernhard Willhelm Edouard Liebert.
Castlerigg and Derwentwater Inclosure Act 1842	5 & 6 Vict. c. 44 Pr.	13 May 1842
An Act for inclosing Lands in the Manor of Castlerigg and Derwentwater in the Parish of Crosthwaite in the County of Cumberland.
Mieville's Divorce Act 1842	5 & 6 Vict. c. 45 Pr.	13 May 1842
An Act to dissolve the Marriage of John otherwise Jean Louis Mieville with Mary Ann his now Wife and to enable him to marry again; and for other Purposes therein mentioned.
Fierville's Naturalization Act 1842	5 & 6 Vict. c. 46 Pr.	13 May 1842
An Act for naturalizing Charles Jacques Marion Fierville.
Benecke's Naturalization Act 1842	5 & 6 Vict. c. 47 Pr.	13 May 1842
An Act for naturalizing Frederick William Benecke.
Glegg's Divorce Act 1842	5 & 6 Vict. c. 48 Pr.	31 May 1842
An Act to dissolve the Marriage of John Baskervyle Glegg Esquire the younger with Elizabeth Glegg his now Wife, and to enable him to marry again; and for other Purposes.
Bates's Naturalization Act 1842	5 & 6 Vict. c. 49 Pr.	31 May 1842
An Act for naturalizing Joshua Bates.
Gair's Naturalization Act 1842	5 & 6 Vict. c. 50 Pr.	18 June 1842
An Act for naturalizing Samuel Stillman Gair.
Ashton's Divorce Act 1842	5 & 6 Vict. c. 51 Pr.	30 June 1842
An Act to dissolve the Marriage of William Ashton Esquire with Anne Jane otherwise Jane Anne his now Wife, and to enable him to many again; and for other Purposes therein mentioned.
Rouma's Naturalization Act 1842	5 & 6 Vict. c. 52 Pr.	30 June 1842
An Act for naturalizing Pierre Lambert Flavian Rouma and others.
Lesbazeilles' Naturalization Act 1842	5 & 6 Vict. c. 53 Pr.	30 June 1842
An Act for naturalizing Jean Baptiste Lesbazeilles and others.
Hawkes's Divorce Act 1842	5 & 6 Vict. c. 54 Pr.	9 July 1842
An Act to dissolve the Marriage of John Hawkes with Fanny his now Wife, and to enable him to marry again; and for other Purposes.
Vere's Divorce Act 1842	5 & 6 Vict. c. 55 Pr.	16 July 1842
An Act to dissolve the Marriage of Joseph Vere with Ellen Sarah his now Wife, and to enable him to many again; and for other Purposes.
Coward's Divorce Act 1842	5 & 6 Vict. c. 56 Pr.	30 July 1842
An Act to dissolve the Marriage of George William Henry Coward with Anne Coward his now Wife, and to enable him to marry again; and for other Purposes.
Versconsin's Naturalization Act 1842	5 & 6 Vict. c. 57 Pr.	30 July 1842
An Act for naturalizing Pierre Frederic Eugéne Verconsin.
Street's Divorce Act 1842	5 & 6 Vict. c. 58 Pr.	10 August 1842
An Act to dissolve the Marriage of Henry Street with Eliza Street his now Wife; and to enable him to many again; and for other Purposes therein mentioned.
Thomas Sewell's Divorce Act 1842	5 & 6 Vict. c. 59 Pr.	10 August 1842
An Act to dissolve the Marriage of Thomas Sewell Esquire with Margaret Susannah his now Wife, and to enable him to marry again; and for other Purposes therein mentioned.

=== Sources ===
- The Statutes of the United Kingdom of Great Britain and Ireland, 5 & 6 Victoria. 1842. London. 1842 – via Internet Archive. (note: this copy has pagination issues)
- A Collection of the Public General Statutes Passed in the Fifth and Sixth Year of the Reign of Her Majesty Queen Victoria, 1842. London: Eyre & Spottiswoode. 1842 – via Internet Archive. (note: this copy has pagination issues)
- "5° & 6° Victoriæ". The Statutes of the United Kingdom of Great Britain and Ireland. Vol. 16: 5 & 6 Victoria (1842) and 6 & 7 Victoria (1843). London: Eyre & Spottiswoode. 1843. pp. 1–583 – via Google Books.
- Journals of the House of Commons (PDF). Vol. 97 – via parliament.uk.

== See also ==
- List of acts of the Parliament of the United Kingdom
