= Irish Bankrupt and Insolvent Act 1857 =

Act of the Parliament of the United Kingdom

Irish Bankrupt and Insolvent Act 1857 (Note: Section III.)
- Act of Parliament
- Parliament of the United Kingdom
- Long title: An Act to consolidate and amend the Laws relating to Bankruptcy and Insolvency in Ireland.
- Citation: 20 & 21 Vict. c. 60
- Territorial extent: Ireland (Note: Section 310.)

Dates
- Royal assent: 25 August 1857
- Commencement: 1 November 1857 (Note: Section 5.)
- Repealed: 1 October 1991
Other legislation
Amends	See § Repealed enactments
Repeals/revokes	See § Repealed enactments
Amended by	Bankruptcy (Ireland) Amendment Act 1872; Forgery Act 1913; Judicature (Northern Ireland) Act 1978; Statute Law (Repeals) Act 1981
Repealed by	Insolvency (Northern Ireland) Order 1989

Status: Repealed

Text of statute as originally enacted

The Irish Bankrupt and Insolvent Act 1857 (20 & 21 Vict. c. 60) was an act of the Parliament of the United Kingdom that consolidated enactments related to bankruptcy and insolvency in Ireland.

== Provisions ==
=== Repealed enactments ===
Section 2 of the act repealed 15 enactments, listed in schedule (A.) to the act.

Citation	Short title	Description	Extent of repeal
1 & 2 Geo. 4. c. 40	Frauds by Bankrupts (Ireland) Act 1821	An Act to repeal so much of an Act made in the Parliament of Ireland in the Eleventh and Twelfth Years of the Reign of King George the Third, for preventing Frauds committed by Bankrupts, as inflicts Capital Punishment on certain Offences therein specified and to provide more suitable and effectual Punishment for such Offences.	The whole act.
6 Will. 4. c. 14	Bankruptcy (Ireland) Act 1836	An Act to amend the Laws relating to Bankrupts in Ireland.	The whole act.
6 & 7 Will. 4. c. 74	Court of Chancery (Ireland) Act 1836	An Act to abolish certain Offices connected with the Court of Chancery in Ireland, and to provide for the Performance of the Duties thereof.	Clause XXXIV in the Copy printed by Her Majesty's Printers.
1 Vict. c. 48	Bankruptcy (Ireland) Act 1837	An Act to appoint a Second Commissioner of Bankrupts in Ireland, and to amend an Act passed in the 6th and 7th Years of the Reign of His late Majesty King William the Fourth, intituled "An Act to amend the Laws relating to Bankrupts in Ireland."	The whole act.
2 & 3 Vict. c. 86	Bankruptcy (Ireland) Act 1839	An Act to amend an Act passed in the Sessions holden in the Sixth Year of His late Majesty King William the Fourth, for amending the Laws relating to Bankrupts in Ireland.	The whole act.
3 & 4 Vict. c. 105	Debtors (Ireland) Act 1840	An Act for abolishing Arrest on Mesne Process in Civil Actions, except in certain Cases; for extending the Remedies of Creditors against the Property of Debtors and for the further Amendment of the Law and the better Advancement of Justice in Ireland.	Clause VIII in the Copy printed by Her Majesty's Printers.
3 & 4 Vict. c. 107	Insolvent Debtors (Ireland) Act 1840	An Act to continue and amend the Laws for the Relief of Insolvent Debtors in Ireland.	The whole act.
4 & 5 Vict. c. 47	Insolvent Debtors (Ireland) Act 1841	N/A	The whole act.
5 & 6 Vict. c. 95	Four Courts Marshalsea (Ireland) Act 1842	An Act for consolidating the Four Courts Marshalsea, Dublin, and the City Marshalsea, Dublin, and for regulating the Four Courts Marshalsea Ireland.	Clauses VII and VIII in the Copy printed by Her Majesty's Printers.
7 & 8 Vict. c. 90	Judgments (Ireland) Act 1844	An Act for the Protection of Purchasers against Judgments, Crown Debts, Lis Pendens, and Commissions of Bankruptcy, and for providing One Office for the registering all Judgments in Ireland; and for amending the Laws of Ireland respecting Bankrupts and the Limitation of Actions.	Clauses XXXVI, XXXVII and XXXVIII in the Copy printed by Her Majesty's Printers.
8 & 9 Vict. c. 48	Bankruptcy Act 1845	An Act to substitute a Declaration for an Oath in Cases of Bankruptcy.	So far as relates to Ireland.
8 & 9 Vict. c. 98	Joint Stock Companies (Ireland) Act 1845	An Act for facilitating the winding up the Affairs of Joint Stock Companies in Ireland unable to meet their pecuniary Engagements.	The whole, save Clause XXIX in the Copy printed by Her Majesty's Printers.
10 & 11 Vict. c. 85	Post Office (Duties) Act 1847	An Act for giving further Facilities for the Transmission of Letters by Post, and for the regulating the Duties of Postage thereon, and for other Purposes relating to the Post Office.	Clause XI in the Copy printed by Her Majesty's Printers.
12 & 13 Vict. c. 107	Bankruptcy (Ireland) Act 1849	An Act for the Amendment of the Law of Bankruptcy in Ireland.	The whole act.
14 & 15 Vict. c. 57	Civil Bill Courts (Ireland) Act 1851	An Act to consolidate and amend the Laws relating to Civil Bills and the Courts of Quarter Sessions in Ireland, and to transfer to the Assistant Barristers certain Jurisdiction as to Insolvent Debtors.	Clause CXIX in the Copy printed by Her Majesty's Printers.

== Subsequent developments ==
The whole act was repealed by article 382 of, and schedule 10 to, the Insolvency (Northern Ireland) Order 1989, which came into operation on 1 October 1991.
