= Queen's Prison Act 1842 =

Act of the Parliament of the United Kingdom

Queen's Prison Act 1842 (Note: The citation of this act by this short title was authorised by section 1 of, and the first schedule to, the Short Titles Act 1896. Due to the repeal of those provisions it is now authorised by section 19(2) of the Interpretation Act 1978.)
- Act of Parliament
- Parliament of the United Kingdom
- Long title: An Act for consolidating the Queen's Bench, Fleet, and Marshalsea Prisons, and for regulating the Queen's Prison.
- Citation: 5 & 6 Vict. c. 22
- Territorial extent: United Kingdom

Dates
- Royal assent: 31 May 1842
- Commencement: 31 May 1842 (Note: The Acts of Parliament (Commencement) Act 1793.)
- Repealed: 23 May 1950

Other legislation
- Amends: King's Bench Prison Act 1754
- Repealed by: Statute Law Revision (No. 2) Act 1888; Statute Law Revision Act 1950

Status: Repealed

Text of statute as originally enacted

The Queen's Prison Act 1842 (5 & 6 Vict. c. 22) was an act of the Parliament of the United Kingdom that consolidated the Queen's Bench Prison, the Fleet Prison and the Marshalsea into a single prison, called the Queen's Prison, and regulated its administration.

== Provisions ==
The act renamed the Prison of the Marshalsea of the Court of Queen's Bench as the Queen's Prison and made it the only prison for debtors, bankrupts and other persons who might formerly have been imprisoned in the Queen's Bench, Fleet or Marshalsea prisons, all of whom were to be in the custody of the Marshal (from 1842's next vacancy in that office, styled the Keeper) of the Queen's Prison.

=== Repealed enactments ===
Section 21 of the act repealed 1 enactment, listed in that section.

Citation	Short title	Description	Extent of repeal
27 Geo. 2. c. 17	King's Bench Prison Act 1754	An Act for re-vesting in the Crown the Power of appointing the Marshal of the Marshalsea of the Court of King's Bench, and for the better Regulation of that Office, and of the inferior Offices thereto belonging, and for rebuilding the King's Bench Prison.	So much as provided that the Marshal of the Marshalsea for the time being should, at his own costs and charges, out of the fees and profits incident to his office, well and sufficiently repair and keep in good repair the said prison, and all the buildings and appurtenances thereunto belonging.

== Subsequent developments ==
The Queen's Prison was discontinued and its remaining prisoners removed to Whitecross Street Prison by the Queen's Prison Discontinuance Act 1862 (25 & 26 Vict. c. 104), following the reduction in the number of debtors committed to prison brought about by the Bankruptcy Act 1861 (24 & 25 Vict. c. 134).

The whole act, except section 5 from "as soon” to the end of the section, was repealed by section 1 of, and the schedule to, the Statute Law Revision (No. 2) Act 1888 (51 & 52 Vict. c. 3), which came into force on 24 December 1888.

The whole act, so far as unrepealed, was repealed by section 1(1) of, and the first schedule to, the Statute Law Revision Act 1950 (14 Geo. 6. c. 6), which came into force on 23 May 1950.
