= Four Courts Marshalsea (Ireland) Act 1842 =

Act of the Parliament of the United Kingdom

- Act of Parliament
- Parliament of the United Kingdom
- Long title: An Act for consolidating the Four Courts Marshalsea, Dublin, Sheriffs Prison, Dublin, and City Marshalsea, Dublin, and for regulating the Four Courts Marshalsea in Ireland.
- Citation: 5 & 6 Vict. c. 95
- Territorial extent: United Kingdom

Dates
- Royal assent: 10 August 1842
- Commencement: 10 August 1842 (Note: The Acts of Parliament (Commencement) Act 1793.)
- Repealed: 20 June 1892

Other legislation
- Repealed by: Statute Law Revision Act 1892

Status: Repealed

Text of statute as originally enacted

The Four Courts Marshalsea (Ireland) Act 1842 (5 & 6 Vict. c. 95) was an act of the Parliament of the United Kingdom that consolidated three prisons for debtors in Dublin — the Four Courts Marshalsea, the Sheriffs Prison, and the City Marshalsea — into a single prison, the Four Courts Marshalsea, and made further provision for its regulation.

== Subsequent developments ==
The Four Courts Marshalsea itself was later closed by the Four Courts Marshalsea Discontinuance Act 1874 (37 & 38 Vict. c. 21), owing to the small and diminishing number of prisoners confined there in proportion to its staff.

The whole act was repealed by section 1 of, and the schedule to, the Statute Law Revision Act 1892 (55 & 56 Vict. c. 19), which came into force on 20 June 1892.
