= Statute Law Revision Act 1892 =

Act of the Parliament of the United Kingdom

Statute Law Revision Act 1892 (Note: Section 3.)
- Act of Parliament
- Parliament of the United Kingdom
- Long title: An Act for further promoting the Revision of the Statute Law by repealing Enactments which have ceased to be in force or have become unnecessary.
- Citation: 55 & 56 Vict. c. 19
- Introduced by: Hardinge Giffard, 1st Baron Halsbury (Lords)
- Territorial extent: United Kingdom

Dates
- Royal assent: 20 June 1892
- Commencement: 20 June 1892 (Note: The Acts of Parliament (Commencement) Act 1793.)
- Repealed: 19 November 1998
Other legislation
Amends	See § Repealed enactments
Repeals/revokes	See § Repealed enactments
Amended by	Statute Law Revision Act 1894; Statute Law Revision Act 1908; Courts Act 1971; Administration of Justice Act 1977
Repealed by	Statute Law (Repeals) Act 1998
Relates to	Repeal of Obsolete Statutes Act 1856; See Statute Law Revision Act

Status: Repealed

History of passage through Parliament

Records of Parliamentary debate relating to the statute from Hansard

Text of statute as originally enacted

The Statute Law Revision Act 1892 (55 & 56 Vict. c. 19) was an act of the Parliament of the United Kingdom that repealed various United Kingdom enactments which had ceased to be in force or had become necessary. The act was intended, in particular, to facilitate the preparation of the new edition of the revised edition of the statutes, then in progress.

The act was the first Statute Law Revision Act to be committed to the Joint Committee for consideration of Statute Law Revision Bills, a procedure designed to increase the accuracy of such bills.

Section 3 of the Statute Law Revision (No. 2) Act 1893 (56 & 57 Vict. c. 54) provided that the second schedule to that act was to be substituted for so much of this act as related to the Cambridge University Act 1856 (19 & 20 Vict. c. 88).

Section 3 of the Statute Law Revision Act 1894 (57 & 58 Vict. c. 56) provided that the second schedule to that act was to be substituted for so much of this act and of the Statute Law Revision (No. 2) Act 1888 (51 & 52 Vict. c. 57) as related to the Small Debt (Scotland) Act 1837 (7 Will. 4 & 1 Vict. c. 41) and to the Burning of Houses (Dublin) Act 1841 (4 & 5 Vict. c. 10), and that "the said Statute Law Revision Acts" were to be read and construed accordingly.

== Background ==
In the United Kingdom, acts of Parliament remain in force until expressly repealed. Blackstone's Commentaries on the Laws of England, published in the late 18th-century, raised questions about the system and structure of the common law and the poor drafting and disorder of the existing statute book.

In 1806, the Commission on Public Records passed a resolution requesting the production of a report on the best mode of reducing the volume of the statute book. From 1810 to 1825, The Statutes of the Realm was published, providing for the first time the authoritative collection of acts. In 1816, both Houses of Parliament, passed resolutions that an eminent lawyer with 20 clerks be commissioned to make a digest of the statutes, which was declared "very expedient to be done." However, this was never done.

At the start of the parliamentary session in 1853, Lord Cranworth announced his intention to the improvement of the statute law and in March 1853, appointed the Board for the Revision of the Statute Law to repeal expired statutes and continue consolidation, with a wider remit that included civil law. The Board issued three reports, recommending the creation of a permanent body for statute law reform.

In 1854, Lord Cranworth appointed the Royal Commission for Consolidating the Statute Law to consolidate existing statutes and enactments of English law. The Commission made four reports.

An alternative approach, focusing on expunging obsolete laws from the statute book, followed by consolidation, was proposed by Peter Locke King MP, who was heavily critical of the expenditure of the Commission and the lack of results. This approach was taken by the Repeal of Obsolete Statutes Act 1856 (19 & 20 Vict. c. 64), considered to be the first Statute Law Revision Act.

On 17 February 1860, the Attorney General, Sir Richard Bethell told the House of Commons that he had engaged Sir Francis Reilly and A. J. Wood to expurgate the statute book of all acts which, though not expressly repealed, were not in force, working backwards from the present time.

Previous Acts
Year passed	Title	Citation	Effect
1861	Statute Law Revision Act 1861	24 & 25 Vict. c. 101	Repealed or amended over 800 enactments
1863	Statute Law Revision Act 1863	26 & 27 Vict. c. 125	Repealed or amended over 1,600 enactments for England and Wales
1867	Statute Law Revision Act 1867	30 & 31 Vict. c. 59	Repealed or amended over 1,380 enactments
1870	Statute Law Revision Act 1870	33 & 34 Vict. c. 69	Repealed or amended over 250 enactments
1871	Promissory Oaths Act 1871	34 & 35 Vict. c. 48	Repealed or amended almost 200 enactments
1871	Statute Law Revision Act 1871	34 & 35 Vict. c. 116	Repealed or amended over 1,060 enactments
1872	Statute Law Revision Act 1872	35 & 36 Vict. c. 63	Repealed or amended almost 490 enactments
1872	Statute Law (Ireland) Revision Act 1872	35 & 36 Vict. c. 98	Repealed or amended over 1,050 enactments
1872	Statute Law Revision Act 1872 (No. 2)	35 & 36 Vict. c. 97	Repealed or amended almost 260 enactments
1873	Statute Law Revision Act 1873	36 & 37 Vict. c. 91	Repealed or amended 1,225 enactments
1874	Statute Law Revision Act 1874	37 & 38 Vict. c. 35	Repealed or amended over 490 enactments
1874	Statute Law Revision Act 1874 (No. 2)	37 & 38 Vict. c. 96	Repealed or amended almost 470 enactments
1875	Statute Law Revision Act 1875	38 & 39 Vict. c. 66	Repealed or amended over 1,400 enactments
1876	Statute Law Revision (Substituted Enactments) Act 1876	39 & 40 Vict. c. 20	Updated references to repealed acts
1878	Statute Law Revision (Ireland) Act 1878	41 & 42 Vict. c. 57	Repealed or amended over 460 enactments passed by the Parliament of Ireland
1878	Statute Law Revision Act 1878	41 & 42 Vict. c. 79	Repealed or amended over 90 enactments.
1879	Statute Law Revision (Ireland) Act 1879	42 & 43 Vict. c. 24	Repealed or amended over 460 enactments passed by the Parliament of Ireland
1879	Civil Procedure Acts Repeal Act 1879	42 & 43 Vict. c. 59	Repealed or amended over 130 enactments
1881	Statute Law Revision and Civil Procedure Act 1881	44 & 45 Vict. c. 59	Repealed or amended or amended almost 100 enactments relating to civil procedure.
1883	Statute Law Revision Act 1883	46 & 47 Vict. c. 39	Repealed or amended over 475 enactments
1883	Statute Law Revision and Civil Procedure Act 1883	46 & 47 Vict. c. 49	Repealed or amended over 475 enactments
1887	Statute Law Revision Act 1887	50 & 51 Vict. c. 59	Repealed or amended over 200 enactments
1887	Sheriffs Act 1887	50 & 51 Vict. c. 55	Repealed or amended almost 75 enactments related to sheriffs
1887	Coroners Act 1887	50 & 51 Vict. c. 71	Repealed or amended over 30 enactments related to coroners
1888	Statute Law Revision Act 1888	51 & 52 Vict. c. 3	Repealed or amended 620 enactments
1889	Master and Servant Act 1889	52 & 53 Vict. c. 24	Repealed or amended over 20 enactments related to master and servants
1888	Statute Law Revision (No. 2) Act 1888	51 & 52 Vict. c. 57	Repealed or amended ? enactments
1890	Statute Law Revision Act 1890	53 & 54 Vict. c. 33	Repealed or amended ? enactments
1890	Statute Law Revision (No. 2) Act 1890	53 & 54 Vict. c. 51	Repealed or amended ? enactments
1891	Statute Law Revision Act 1891	54 & 55 Vict. c. 67	Repealed or amended ? enactments

== Passage ==
The Statute Law Revision Bill had its first reading in the House of Lords on 3 March 1892, presented by the Lord Chancellor, Hardinge Giffard, 1st Earl of Halsbury. The bill had its second reading in the House of Lords on 14 March 1892, introduced by the Lord Chancellor.

At the same time, on 14 March 1892, the topic of statute law revision was referred to a joint committee of both houses of Parliament, on the motion of the Lord Chancellor.

The Joint Committee on Statute Law Revision was appointed by the House of Lords on 25 March 1892, and the House of Commons on 4 April 1892, consisting of 10 members with a quorum of three.

Name	Party	Commentary
William Watson, Baron Watson	Conservative	
Farrer Herschell, 1st Baron Herschell	Liberal	
Hardinge Giffard, 1st Earl of Halsbury	Conservative	Lord Chancellor
Albert Parker, 3rd Earl of Morley	Liberal	
John Wodehouse, 1st Earl of Kimberley	Liberal	
William Ambrose MP	Conservative	
James Bryce MP	Liberal	
Douglas Coghill MP	Liberal Unionist	
Sir Horace Davey	Liberal	
Sir Edward Clarke MP	Conservative	Solicitor General
Henry Thring, 1st Baron Thring	Crossbench	Added on 7 April 1892
George Howell MP	Liberal-Labour	Added on 11 April 1892

Upon the motion of the Lord Chancellor on 13 May 1892, the bill was committed to the Joint Committee on Statute Law Revision on 17 May 1892, following agreement by the House of Commons. The select committee reported on 13 June 1892, with amendments. The committee expressing their support for the principles and objects of statute law revision and for completing the new edition of the revised edition of the statutes as soon as possible. The committee supported the bill and recommended the creation of a standing joint committee to whom all Statute Law Revision Bills should be referred to be examined and approved.

The amended bill was referred to a committee of the whole house, which met and reported on 14 June 1892, without amendments. The amended bill had its third reading in the House of Lords on X and passed, with amendments, including those recommended by the select committee.

The amended bill had its first reading in the House of Commons on 14 June 1892. The bill had its second reading in the House of Commons on 15 June 1892 and was committed to a committee of the whole house, which met and reported on 16 June 1892, without amendments. The bill had its third reading in the House of Commons on 16 June 1892 and passed, without amendments.

The bill was granted royal assent on 20 June 1892.

== Subsequent developments ==
Following the passing of the act, the Joint Committee for consideration of Statute Law Revision Bills was established in 1892 to strengthen accuracy of future Statute Law Revision Bills.

As to the effect of the act, see Morse v Muir, Watkins v Reddy, People (Attorney General) v Murtagh, Smith v Smith, Robins v Robins, In re M'Naul's Estate, Morrison v Stubbs and Huffam v North Staffordshire Railway Company.

The schedule to the act was repealed by section 1 of, and the schedule to, the Statute Law Revision Act 1908 (8 Edw. 7. c. 49)), which came into force on 21 December 1908.

The words "to the court of the county palatine of Lancaster or" in section 2 of the act were repealed by section 56(4) of, and part II of schedule 11 to, the Courts Act 1971, which came into force on 1 January 1972.

Section 2 of the act was repealed by section 32(4) of, and part V of schedule 5 to, the Administration of Justice Act 1977, which came into force on 29 July 1977.

The enactments which were repealed (whether for the whole or any part of the United Kingdom) by the act were repealed so far as they extended to the Isle of Man by section 1(1) of, and schedule 1 to, the Statute Law Revision (Isle of Man) Act 1991, which came into force on 25 July 1991.

The whole act was repealed by section 1(1) of, and group 1 of part IX of schedule 1 to, the Statute Law (Repeals) Act 1998, which came into force on 19 November 1998.

The act was retained for the Republic of Ireland by section 2(2)(a) of, and part 4 of schedule 1 to, the Statute Law Revision Act 2007, which came into force on 8 May 2007.

== Repealed enactments ==
Section 1 of the act repealed enactments, listed in the schedule to the act, across six categories: (Note: The Note of the bill, unlike the schedule, gives commentary on each act, noting any earlier repeals and the reason for the new repeal.)

- Expired
- Spent
- Repealed in general terms
- Virtually repealed
- Superseded
- Obsolete

Section 1 of the act also provided that parts of titles, preambles, or recitals specified after the words "In part, namely" in connection with acts mentioned in the first schedule to the act could be omitted from any revised edition of the statutes published by authority, with brief statements about the acts, officers, persons, and things mentioned in those titles/preambles/recitals being added as necessary.

Section 1 of the act provided that repeals were subject to the standard Westbury Saving.

Section 2 of the act provided that if any repealed enactment had been applied to the Court of the County Palatine of Lancaster or other inferior civil courts, such enactment would be construed as if it were contained in a local and personal act specifically relating to that court, and would have effect accordingly.

== See also ==
- Statute Law Revision Act

== Bibliography ==
- John Mounteney Lely. "Statute Law Revision Act, 1892". The Statutes of Practical Utility. (Chitty's Statutes). Fifth Edition. Sweet and Maxwell. Stevens and Sons. London. 1894. Volume 1. Title "Act of Parliament". Pages 32 to 37.
- John Mounteney Lely. "Statute Law Revision Act, 1892". Statutes of Practical Utility Passed in the Session of 1892 ending in June. (Continuation of Chitty's Statutes). Sweet and Maxwell. Stevens and Sons. London. August 1892. Pages 384 to 407. See also page iii.
- James Sutherland Cotton (ed). "Statute Law Revision Act, 1892". The Practical Statutes of the Session 1892. (Paterson's Practical Statutes). Horace Cox. Windsor House, Bream's Buildings, London. 1892. Pages 117 to 183.
- "Obiter Dicta" (1892) 27 The Law Journal 475 at 476
- James Roberts, "Statute Law Revision" (1892) 94 The Law Times 18; (1892) 27 The Law Journal 705
- "Statute Law Revision Act, 1892" (1892) 11 The Law Notes 300
- Thwaites, "Students' Statutes" (1892) 14 The Law Students' Journal 209 at 211 (1 September)
- "Irish Statute Law Revision" (1893) 27 Irish Law Times and Solicitors' Journal 239, 240, 249, 250.
- "Statute Law Revision" (1892) 93 The Law Times 55, 80, 149, 170, 179 and 449
- Jenks, Geldart, Holdsworth, Lee and Miles. A Digest of English Civil Law. Second Edition. Butterworth & Co. London. 1921. Volume 2. Paragraph 2063 at page 1305.
- 165 The Law Times 167 (25 February 1928)
- Annotated Laws of Palestine. 1944. Volume 1. Page 14.
