= Statute Law Revision (No. 2) Act 1890 =

Act of the Parliament of the United Kingdom

Statute Law Revision (No. 2) Act 1890 (Note: Section 4.)
- Act of Parliament
- Parliament of the United Kingdom
- Long title: An Act for further promoting the Revision of the Statute Law by repealing enactments which have ceased to be in force or have become unnecessary.
- Citation: 53 & 54 Vict. c. 51
- Introduced by: Hardinge Giffard, 1st Baron Halsbury (Lords)
- Territorial extent: United Kingdom

Dates
- Royal assent: 18 August 1890
- Commencement: 18 August 1890 (Note: The Acts of Parliament (Commencement) Act 1793.)
Other legislation
Amends	See § Repealed enactments
Repeals/revokes	See § Repealed enactments
Amended by	Statute Law Revision Act 1908; Courts Act 1971; Administration of Justice Act 1977; Statute Law (Repeals) Act 1981
Relates to	Repeal of Obsolete Statutes Act 1856; See Statute Law Revision Act

Status: Partially repealed

History of passage through Parliament

Records of Parliamentary debate relating to the statute from Hansard

Text of statute as originally enacted

The Statute Law Revision (No. 2) Act 1890 (53 & 54 Vict. c. 51) is an act of the Parliament of the United Kingdom that repealed various United Kingdom enactments which had ceased to be in force or had become necessary. The act was intended, in particular, to facilitate the preparation of the new edition of the revised edition of the statutes, then in progress.

As of 2026 the act remains partly in force in the United Kingdom.

== Background ==
In the United Kingdom, acts of Parliament remain in force until expressly repealed. Blackstone's Commentaries on the Laws of England, published in the late 18th-century, raised questions about the system and structure of the common law and the poor drafting and disorder of the existing statute book.

From 1810 to 1825, the The Statutes of the Realm was published, providing the first authoritative collection of acts. The first statute law revision act was not passed until 1856 with the Repeal of Obsolete Statutes Act 1856 (19 & 20 Vict. c. 64). This approach — focusing on removing obsolete laws from the statute book followed by consolidation — was proposed by Peter Locke King MP, who had been highly critical of previous commissions' approaches, expenditures, and lack of results.

Previous Acts
Year passed	Title	Citation	Effect
1861	Statute Law Revision Act 1861	24 & 25 Vict. c. 101	Repealed or amended over 800 enactments
1863	Statute Law Revision Act 1863	26 & 27 Vict. c. 125	Repealed or amended over 1,600 enactments for England and Wales
1867	Statute Law Revision Act 1867	30 & 31 Vict. c. 59	Repealed or amended over 1,380 enactments
1870	Statute Law Revision Act 1870	33 & 34 Vict. c. 69	Repealed or amended over 250 enactments
1871	Promissory Oaths Act 1871	34 & 35 Vict. c. 48	Repealed or amended almost 200 enactments
1871	Statute Law Revision Act 1871	34 & 35 Vict. c. 116	Repealed or amended over 1,060 enactments
1872	Statute Law Revision Act 1872	35 & 36 Vict. c. 63	Repealed or amended almost 490 enactments
1872	Statute Law (Ireland) Revision Act 1872	35 & 36 Vict. c. 98	Repealed or amended over 1,050 enactments
1872	Statute Law Revision Act 1872 (No. 2)	35 & 36 Vict. c. 97	Repealed or amended almost 260 enactments
1873	Statute Law Revision Act 1873	36 & 37 Vict. c. 91	Repealed or amended 1,225 enactments
1874	Statute Law Revision Act 1874	37 & 38 Vict. c. 35	Repealed or amended over 490 enactments
1874	Statute Law Revision Act 1874 (No. 2)	37 & 38 Vict. c. 96	Repealed or amended almost 470 enactments
1875	Statute Law Revision Act 1875	38 & 39 Vict. c. 66	Repealed or amended over 1,400 enactments
1876	Statute Law Revision (Substituted Enactments) Act 1876	39 & 40 Vict. c. 20	Updated references to repealed acts
1878	Statute Law Revision (Ireland) Act 1878	41 & 42 Vict. c. 57	Repealed or amended over 460 enactments passed by the Parliament of Ireland
1878	Statute Law Revision Act 1878	41 & 42 Vict. c. 79	Repealed or amended over 90 enactments.
1879	Statute Law Revision (Ireland) Act 1879	42 & 43 Vict. c. 24	Repealed or amended over 460 enactments passed by the Parliament of Ireland
1879	Civil Procedure Acts Repeal Act 1879	42 & 43 Vict. c. 59	Repealed or amended over 130 enactments
1881	Statute Law Revision and Civil Procedure Act 1881	44 & 45 Vict. c. 59	Repealed or amended or amended almost 100 enactments relating to civil procedure.
1883	Statute Law Revision Act 1883	46 & 47 Vict. c. 39	Repealed or amended over 475 enactments
1883	Statute Law Revision and Civil Procedure Act 1883	46 & 47 Vict. c. 49	Repealed or amended over 475 enactments
1887	Statute Law Revision Act 1887	50 & 51 Vict. c. 59	Repealed or amended over 200 enactments
1887	Sheriffs Act 1887	50 & 51 Vict. c. 55	Repealed or amended almost 75 enactments related to sheriffs
1887	Coroners Act 1887	50 & 51 Vict. c. 71	Repealed or amended over 30 enactments related to coroners
1888	Statute Law Revision Act 1888	51 & 52 Vict. c. 3	Repealed or amended 620 enactments
1888	Statute Law Revision (No. 2) Act 1888	51 & 52 Vict. c. 57	Repealed or amended ? enactments
1889	Master and Servant Act 1889	52 & 53 Vict. c. 24	Repealed or amended over 20 enactments related to master and servants
1890	Statute Law Revision Act 1890	53 & 54 Vict. c. 33	Repealed or amended ? enactments

== Passage ==
The Statute Law Revision (No. 2) Bill had its first reading in the House of Lords on 28 July 1890, introduced by the Lord Chancellor, Hardinge Giffard, 1st Earl of Halsbury. The bill had its second reading in the House of Lords on 29 July 1890 and was committed to a committee of the whole house, which met and reported on 31 July 1890, without amendments. The bill had its third reading in the House of Lords on 31 July 1890 and passed, with amendments.

The bill had its first reading in the House of Commons on 31 July 1890. The bill had its second reading in the House of Commons on 4 August 1890 and was committed to a select committee. The select committee was appointed on 5 August 1890, consisting of 9 members with a quorum of three and the power to "send for persons, paper and records".

Name	Party	Commentary
William Ambrose MP	Conservative	
H. H. Asquith MP	Liberal	
James Bryce MP	Liberal	
Douglas Coghill MP	Liberal Unionist	
Charles Isaac Elton MP	Conservative	
George Howell MP	Liberal-Labour	
Edmund Vesey Knox MP	Irish Parliamentary Party	
Sir Edward Clarke MP	Conservative	Solicitor General, Chair
Edward Whitley MP	Conservative	

The select committee met on 6 August 1890, and reported on 7 August 1890, without amendments. The bill was recommitted to a committee of the whole house, which met on 13 August 1890 and reported on 15 August 1890, with amendments. The amended bill had its third reading in the House of Commons on 15 August 1890 and passed, without amendments. During debate, a motion to adjourn the reading was defeated.

The amended bill was considered and agreed to by the House of Lords on 15 August 1890.

The bill was granted royal assent on 18 August 1890.

== Repealed enactments ==
Section 1 of the act repealed enactments, listed in the schedule to the act, across six categories: (Note: The Note of the bill, unlike the schedule, gives commentary on each act, noting any earlier repeals and the reason for the new repeal.)

- Expired
- Spent
- Repealed in general terms
- Virtually repealed
- Superseded
- Obsolete

Section 1 of the act also provided that parts of titles, preambles, or recitals specified after the words "In part, namely" in connection with acts mentioned in the first schedule to the act could be omitted from any revised edition of the statutes published by authority, with brief statements about the acts, officers, persons, and things mentioned in those titles/preambles/recitals being added as necessary.

Section 1 of the act provided that repeals were subject to the standard Westbury Saving.

Section 2 of the act provided that if any repealed enactment had been applied to the Court of the County Palatine of Lancaster or other inferior civil courts, such enactment would be construed as if it were contained in a local and personal act specifically relating to that court, and would have effect accordingly.

Section 2 of the act provided that all enactments relating to turnpike trusts or turnpike roads in England and Wales could be omitted from any revised edition of the statutes published by authority after the passing of the act, treating them as if they were local and personal acts.

== Subsequent developments ==
The schedule to the act was repealed by section 1 of, and the schedule to, the Statute Law Revision Act 1908 (8 Edw. 7. c. 49), which came into force on 21 December 1908.

The words "to the court of the county palatine of Lancaster or" in section 2 of the act were repealed by section 56(4) of, and part II of schedule 11 to, the Courts Act 1971, which came into force on 1 January 1972.

Section 2 of the act was repealed by section 32(4) of, and part V of schedule 5 to, the Administration of Justice Act 1977, which came into force on 29 July 1977.

Section 3 of the act was repealed by section 1(1) of, and part X of schedule 1 to, the Statute Law (Repeals) Act 1981, which came into force on 21 May 1981.

The act was retained for the Republic of Ireland by section 2(2)(a) of, and part 4 of schedule 1 to, the Statute Law Revision Act 2007, which came into force on 8 May 2007.

== See also ==
- Statute Law Revision Act
