= Statute Law Revision (No. 2) Act 1888 =

Act of the Parliament of the United Kingdom

Statute Law Revision (No. 2) Act 1888 (Note: Section 3.)
- Act of Parliament
- Parliament of the United Kingdom
- Long title: An Act for further promoting the Revision of the Statute Law by repealing superfluous expressions of enactment, and enactments which have ceased to be in force or have become unnecessary.
- Citation: 51 & 52 Vict. c. 57
- Introduced by: Hardinge Giffard, 1st Baron Halsbury (Lords)
- Territorial extent: United Kingdom

Dates
- Royal assent: 24 December 1888
- Commencement: 24 December 1888 (Note: The Acts of Parliament (Commencement) Act 1793.)
- Repealed: 16 November 1989
Other legislation
Amends	See § Repealed enactments
Repeals/revokes	See § Repealed enactments
Amended by	Statute Law Revision Act 1894; Statute Law Revision Act 1890; Statute Law Revision Act 1908; Courts Act 1971; Administration of Justice Act 1977
Repealed by	Statute Law (Repeals) Act 1989
Relates to	Repeal of Obsolete Statutes Act 1856; See Statute Law Revision Act

Status: Repealed

History of passage through Parliament

Records of Parliamentary debate relating to the statute from Hansard

Text of statute as originally enacted

The Statute Law Revision (No. 2) Act 1888 (51 & 52 Vict. c. 57) was an act of the Parliament of the United Kingdom that repealed various United Kingdom enactments which had ceased to be in force or had become necessary. The act was intended, in particular, to facilitate the preparation of the new edition of the revised edition of the statutes, then in progress.

Section 5 of the Statute Law Revision Act 1890 (53 & 54 Vict. c. 33) provided that the Act was to be read and construed as if, in the entry in the schedule to the act relating to the Assizes (Ireland) Act 1835 (5 & 6 Will. 4. c. 26), the reference to sections 1 and 2 and 3 were replaced by reference to sections 2 and 3 and 4.

Section 3 of the Statute Law Revision Act 1894 (57 & 58 Vict. c. 56) provided that the second schedule to that act was to be substituted for so much of this act and of the Statute Law Revision Act 1892 (55 & 56 Vict. c. 19) as related to the Small Debt (Scotland) Act 1837 (7 Will. 4 & 1 Vict. c. 41) and to the Burning of Houses (Dublin) Act 1841 (4 & 5 Vict. c. 10), and that "the said Statute Law Revision Acts" were to be read and construed accordingly.

The act contained the final form of the Westbury saving, found in every statute law revision act until the Statute Law Revision Act 1953 (2 & 3 Eliz. 2. c. 5).

== Background ==
In the United Kingdom, acts of Parliament remain in force until expressly repealed. Blackstone's Commentaries on the Laws of England, published in the late 18th-century, raised questions about the system and structure of the common law and the poor drafting and disorder of the existing statute book.

From 1810 to 1825, the The Statutes of the Realm was published, providing the first authoritative collection of acts. The first statute law revision act was not passed until 1856 with the Repeal of Obsolete Statutes Act 1856 (19 & 20 Vict. c. 64). This approach — focusing on removing obsolete laws from the statute book followed by consolidation — was proposed by Peter Locke King MP, who had been highly critical of previous commissions' approaches, expenditures, and lack of results.

Previous Acts
Year passed	Title	Citation	Effect
1861	Statute Law Revision Act 1861	24 & 25 Vict. c. 101	Repealed or amended over 800 enactments
1863	Statute Law Revision Act 1863	26 & 27 Vict. c. 125	Repealed or amended over 1,600 enactments for England and Wales
1867	Statute Law Revision Act 1867	30 & 31 Vict. c. 59	Repealed or amended over 1,380 enactments
1870	Statute Law Revision Act 1870	33 & 34 Vict. c. 69	Repealed or amended over 250 enactments
1871	Promissory Oaths Act 1871	34 & 35 Vict. c. 48	Repealed or amended almost 200 enactments
1871	Statute Law Revision Act 1871	34 & 35 Vict. c. 116	Repealed or amended over 1,060 enactments
1872	Statute Law Revision Act 1872	35 & 36 Vict. c. 63	Repealed or amended almost 490 enactments
1872	Statute Law (Ireland) Revision Act 1872	35 & 36 Vict. c. 98	Repealed or amended over 1,050 enactments
1872	Statute Law Revision Act 1872 (No. 2)	35 & 36 Vict. c. 97	Repealed or amended almost 260 enactments
1873	Statute Law Revision Act 1873	36 & 37 Vict. c. 91	Repealed or amended 1,225 enactments
1874	Statute Law Revision Act 1874	37 & 38 Vict. c. 35	Repealed or amended over 490 enactments
1874	Statute Law Revision Act 1874 (No. 2)	37 & 38 Vict. c. 96	Repealed or amended almost 470 enactments
1875	Statute Law Revision Act 1875	38 & 39 Vict. c. 66	Repealed or amended over 1,400 enactments
1876	Statute Law Revision (Substituted Enactments) Act 1876	39 & 40 Vict. c. 20	Updated references to repealed acts
1878	Statute Law Revision (Ireland) Act 1878	41 & 42 Vict. c. 57	Repealed or amended over 460 enactments passed by the Parliament of Ireland
1878	Statute Law Revision Act 1878	41 & 42 Vict. c. 79	Repealed or amended over 90 enactments.
1879	Statute Law Revision (Ireland) Act 1879	42 & 43 Vict. c. 24	Repealed or amended over 460 enactments passed by the Parliament of Ireland
1879	Civil Procedure Acts Repeal Act 1879	42 & 43 Vict. c. 59	Repealed or amended over 130 enactments
1881	Statute Law Revision and Civil Procedure Act 1881	44 & 45 Vict. c. 59	Repealed or amended or amended almost 100 enactments relating to civil procedure.
1883	Statute Law Revision Act 1883	46 & 47 Vict. c. 39	Repealed or amended over 475 enactments
1883	Statute Law Revision and Civil Procedure Act 1883	46 & 47 Vict. c. 49	Repealed or amended over 475 enactments
1887	Statute Law Revision Act 1887	50 & 51 Vict. c. 59	Repealed or amended over 200 enactments
1887	Sheriffs Act 1887	50 & 51 Vict. c. 55	Repealed or amended almost 75 enactments related to sheriffs
1887	Coroners Act 1887	50 & 51 Vict. c. 71	Repealed or amended over 30 enactments related to coroners
1888	Statute Law Revision Act 1888	51 & 52 Vict. c. 3	Repealed or amended 620 enactments

== Passage ==
The Statute Law Revision (No. 2) Bill had its first reading in the House of Lords on 6 August 1888, introduced by the Lord Chancellor, Hardinge Giffard, 1st Baron Halsbury. The bill had its second reading in the House of Lords on 20 November 1888 and was committed to a committee of the whole house, which met and reported on 27 November 1888, without amendments. The bill had its third reading in the House of Lords on 4 December 1888 and passed, with amendments.

The amended bill had its first reading in the House of Commons on 8 December 1888. The bill had its second reading in the House of Commons on 14 December 1888 and was committed to a committee of the whole house, which met and reported on 17 December 1888, with amendments. The amended bill had its third reading in the House of Commons on 19 December 1888 and passed, with amendments.

The amended bill was considered and agreed to by the House of Lords on 21 December 1888.

The bill was granted royal assent on 24 December 1888.

== Subsequent developments ==
The schedule to the act was repealed by section 1 of, and the schedule to, the Statute Law Revision Act 1908 (8 Edw. 7. c. 49)), which came into force on 21 December 1908.

The words "to the court of the county palatine of Lancaster or" in section 2 of the act were repealed by section 56(4) of, and part II of schedule 11 to, the Courts Act 1971, which came into force on 1 January 1972.

Section 2 of the act was repealed by section 32(4) of, and part V of schedule 5 to, the Administration of Justice Act 1977, which came into force on 29 July 1977.

The whole act was repealed by section 1(1) of, and part XI of schedule 1 to, the Statute Law (Repeals) Act 1989, which came into force on 16 November 1989.

The act was retained for the Republic of Ireland by section 2(2)(a) of, and part 4 of schedule 1 to, the Statute Law Revision Act 2007, which came into force on 8 May 2007.

== Repealed enactments ==
Section 1 of the act repealed enactments, listed in the schedule to the act, subject to the standard Westbury Saving.

Section 2 of the act provided that if any repealed enactment had been applied to the Court of the County Palatine of Lancaster or other inferior civil courts, such enactment would be construed as if it were contained in a local and personal act specifically relating to that court, and would have effect accordingly.

== See also ==
- Statute Law Revision Act
