= Civil procedure in England and Wales =

The rules of civil procedure in England and Wales that govern the conduct of litigation in the civil courts primarily stem from the Civil Procedure Rules adopted in 1999 as part of the Woolf Reforms, but also from the accompanying Practice Directions, other legislation and case law.

The rules that apply differ depending on the type of claim, but ultimately govern the entire cycle of a case before the courts, including the steps that must be undertaken before the claim is issued, service to the other parties, allocation of the case to the different tracks, adding or substituting parties to a claim, default judgment, summary judgment, striking out all or part of a claim, and disclosure of evidence. The rules also deal with how hearings are conducted both pre-trial and at trial, as well as the remedies (both interim and final) that the court can grant, how they are enforced or appealed, and the assessment of costs.

== Court structure ==
Civil matters are heard at first instance (i.e. not appeals) in either the County Court or High Court. There are some statutory rules determining jurisdiction including the County Courts Act 1984 and the High Court and County Court Jurisdictions Order 1991, which require certain cases to be started in either the County Court or the High Court. For instance, only the High Court has jurisdiction to hear claims in defamation. Some remedies can only be ordered by one court, although procedures exist to transfer cases between the two.

The County Court hears all Small Claim and Fast Track cases. County Court centres designated as 'civil trial centres' may also deal with claims allocated to the Multi Track. Unless the parties agree, cases above £100,000 in value are not usually tried in the County Court.

=== The four tracks ===
All defended cases are allocated to one of four tracks:

- Small Claims Track: Most claims under £10,000. Note: the normal limit for housing disrepair cases and personal injury claims is £1,000.
- Fast Track: Between £10,000 to £25,000
- Intermediate Track: for claims valued at between £25,000 and £100,000, and which could be heard in under three days, and requiring no more than two expert witnesses
- Multi Track: for cases where the value of the claim or the complexity of the evidence and/or legal issues to be decided means the claim is not suitable for the other tracks.

The Jackson Reforms of 2013 altered the upper limit of the small claims track and the lower limit of the fast track, from £5,000 to £10,000.

Procedural rules vary between the different tracks. For instance, in the small claims track, the ability to recover costs is relatively limited, and hearings are conducted in a more informal manner as parties are less likely to be represented.

=== Divisions ===
The High Court has three divisions, namely:

- King's Bench: for contract and tort claims
- Chancery: for disputes involving equity matters such as mortgages, trusts, copyrights, and patents.
- Family: for matrimonial-related disputes and cases relating to children.

== Procedure ==
The Civil Procedure Rules 1998 set out the rules for each stage of a case. The Rules aim to ensure that, when people sue or are sued, they obtain justice.

=== Pre-claim ===
The Civil Procedure Rules define a number of pre-action protocols which "explain the conduct and set out the steps the court would normally expect parties to take before commencing proceedings". The goal is to identify the issues in dispute early, with the goal of enabling parties to settle disputes out of court if possible (including through alternative dispute resolution), and ensuring cases are managed efficiently and at proportionate cost.

For instance, in cases of defamation, the letter of claim must set out details of, say, the article or broadcast that contains the claim, and an explanation of which particular statement is objected to and why. In personal injury claims, the pre-action protocol recommends that unless it is not possible (e.g. due to the limitation deadline), a defendant is given three months to investigate a claim before proceedings are issued.

=== Use of alternative dispute resolution ===
Various procedural mechanisms in the Civil Procedure Rules are used by courts to strongly encourage alternative dispute resolution (such as mediation, conciliation and early neutral evaluation). Unreasonable rejection of an offer to settle a dispute out-of-court can result in unfavourable costs orders. Up until 2023, courts did not require parties to mediate disputes, based on the findings of the Court of Appeal in Halsey v Milton Keynes General NHS Trust that "to oblige truly unwilling parties to refer their disputes to mediation would be to impose an unacceptable obstruction on their right of access to the court", but this position was reversed in Churchill v Merthyr Tydfil County Borough Council.

=== Starting a claim ===
All claims less than £15,000 must be started in the County Court. Claims for more than this amount can be started in either the High Court or the County Court, except personal injury claims for less than £50,000, which must be started in the County Court.

Most claims are started by issuing a Part 7 claim form in which the claimant states the particulars of case, or attaches the particulars to the claim form, or serves them separately within 14 days of the claim form being served.

There must also be a Statement of Truth as to the facts in the particulars of the claim. The claim form and the particulars of the claim must be served on the defendant. Service may be carried by the court or the claimant, and can be made personally, by post, by fax, by e-mail or other electronic means.

Upon service, the defendant has 14 days in which to respond. A defendant may:

- pay the amount claimed
- admit or partly admit the claim
- file an acknowledgement of service (but must then file a defence within another 14 days)
- file a defence

The defendant must, if not admitting the claim, file a defence which substantively answers the claim. It is not enough to simply deny the claim. A defence that offers little more than a bare denial is likely to be struck out by the court.

At any point before or during proceedings, either party may make either a Part 36 offer or a Calderbank offer to settle the claim for damages.

=== Service ===
Once a claim form has been issued, it must be served on the defendant(s). The most common method of service is for the court to send the claim by first-class post, but claims can also be served personally, by leaving the documents at a known address, through Document Exchange, and through electronic means including email and fax. Defendants outside the United Kingdom are afforded a longer period to respond.

== Allocation of cases ==
After the defence has been filed, the court sends to all parties a directions questionnaire. This helps the judge decide the track to which the case should be allocated.

If a party is dissatisfied with the allocation decision an application can be made to court for the claim to be re-allocated.

=== Small Claims procedure ===
Cases are heard by a District Judge who will normally use an interventionist approach. This is an approach that allows the court to try to intervene in helping the parties to agree with one another in sorting out the case. Cases are dealt with in a relatively informal way and are now heard in open court (prior to the 1999 reforms small claim cases were heard in private). The use of solicitors is discouraged because the costs of legal representation cannot be recovered from the losing side. There may be a paper adjudication if the judge thinks it appropriate and the parties agree. This approach will often be used where the legal issues and evidence is clear cut, and the parties bring documents they wish to use. In such cases the court will decide the case 'on the papers' without requiring oral evidence or legal argument.

=== Fast Track procedure ===
All other cases require a process of 'Pre-Trial Directions' being a timetable for the ongoing management of the case. The idea is to simplify the case for the court. The Fast Track mandates a maximum delay of 30 weeks between the setting of Directions, and the trial date. Normally only one expert witness is allowed and, if the parties cannot agree on an expert, the court has the power to appoint one. The expert's evidence will be given in writing. There are fixed costs for the advocate at the trial.

=== Multi Track procedure ===
There is no standard procedure for Pre-Trial Directions in the Multi Track, and the judge has discretion to use a number of case management approaches, including case management conferences and pre-trial reviews. The aim is to identify the issues as early as possible and, where appropriate, to try specific issues prior to the main trial. The number of expert witnesses is controlled by the court as its permission is needed for any party to use an expert to give evidence. All time limits are strictly enforced. The court may in the directions fix a trial date, or order a trial window (approximate date for the trial) with a date being fixed by the court closer to the trial window period. In the Multi Track there is usually some degree of flexibility to shift the date of a specific direction but, once a trial date is fixed, the court is very unlikely to agree to an adjournment without a compelling reason.
