= Statute Law Revision Act 1874 (No. 2) =

Act of the Parliament of the United Kingdom

Statute Law Revision Act 1874 (No. 2) (Note: Section 3. The Statute Law Revision (Isle of Man) Act 1991 and the Statute Law (Repeals) Act 1998 refer to the act as the Statute Law Revision (No.2) Act 1874)
- Act of Parliament
- Parliament of the United Kingdom
- Long title: An Act for promoting the Revision of the Statute Law by repealing certain Enactments which have ceased to be in force or have become unnecessary.
- Citation: 37 & 38 Vict. c. 96
- Introduced by: Richard Baggallay MP (Commons); Hugh Cairns, 1st Baron Cairns (Lords)
- Territorial extent: United Kingdom

Dates
- Royal assent: 7 August 1874
- Commencement: 7 August 1874 (Note: The Acts of Parliament (Commencement) Act 1793.)
- Repealed: 19 November 1998
Other legislation
Amends	Statute Law Revision Act 1874; See § Repealed enactments
Repeals/revokes	See § Repealed enactments
Amended by	Statute Law Revision Act 1894
Repealed by	Statute Law (Repeals) Act 1998
Relates to	Repeal of Obsolete Statutes Act 1856; See Statute Law Revision Act

Status: Repealed

History of passage through Parliament

Records of Parliamentary debate relating to the statute from Hansard

Text of statute as originally enacted

The Statute Law Revision Act 1874 (No. 2) (37 & 38 Vict. c. 96) was an act of the Parliament of the United Kingdom that repealed for the United Kingdom enactments from 1837 to 1843 which had ceased to be in force or had become necessary. The act was intended, in particular, to facilitate the preparation of the revised edition of the statutes, then in progress.

== Background ==
In the United Kingdom, acts of Parliament remain in force until expressly repealed. Blackstone's Commentaries on the Laws of England, published in the late 18th-century, raised questions about the system and structure of the common law and the poor drafting and disorder of the existing statute book.

From 1810 to 1825, The Statutes of the Realm was published, providing the first authoritative collection of acts. The first statute law revision act was not passed until 1856 with the Repeal of Obsolete Statutes Act 1856 (19 & 20 Vict. c. 64). This approach — focusing on removing obsolete laws from the statute book followed by consolidation — was proposed by Peter Locke King MP, who had been highly critical of previous commissions' approaches, expenditures, and lack of results.

Previous statute law revision acts
Year passed	Title	Citation	Effect
1861	Statute Law Revision Act 1861	24 & 25 Vict. c. 101	Repealed or amended over 800 enactments
1863	Statute Law Revision Act 1863	26 & 27 Vict. c. 125	Repealed or amended over 1,600 enactments for England and Wales
1867	Statute Law Revision Act 1867	30 & 31 Vict. c. 59	Repealed or amended over 1,380 enactments
1870	Statute Law Revision Act 1870	33 & 34 Vict. c. 69	Repealed or amended over 250 enactments
1871	Promissory Oaths Act 1871	34 & 35 Vict. c. 48	Repealed or amended almost 200 enactments
1871	Statute Law Revision Act 1871	34 & 35 Vict. c. 116	Repealed or amended over 1,060 enactments
1872	Statute Law Revision Act 1872	35 & 36 Vict. c. 63	Repealed or amended almost 490 enactments
1872	Statute Law (Ireland) Revision Act 1872	35 & 36 Vict. c. 98	Repealed or amended over 1,050 enactments
1872	Statute Law Revision Act 1872 (No. 2)	35 & 36 Vict. c. 97	Repealed or amended almost 260 enactments
1873	Statute Law Revision Act 1873	36 & 37 Vict. c. 91	Repealed or amended 1,225 enactments
1874	Statute Law Revision Act 1874	37 & 38 Vict. c. 35	Repealed or amended over 490 enactments

== Passage ==
The Statute Law Revision (No. 2) Bill had its first reading in the House of Lords on 2 July 1874, introduced by the Lord Chancellor, Hugh Cairns, 1st Baron Cairns. The bill had its second reading in the House of Lords on 27 July 1874 and was committed to a committee of the whole house, which met and reported with amendment on 28 July 1874. The amended bill had its third reading in the House of Lords on 30 July 1874 and passed, with amendments.

The amended bill its first reading in the House of Commons on 30 July 1874, introduced by the Attorney General, Richard Baggallay MP. The bill had its second reading in the House of Commons on 31 July 1874 and was committed to a committee of the whole house, which met and reported without amendment on 1 August 1874. The bill had its third reading in the House of Commons on 3 August 1874.

The bill was granted royal assent on 7 August 1874.

== Subsequent developments ==
The act was intended, in particular, to facilitate the preparation of a revised edition of the statutes.

Section 2 of, and the schedule to, the act was repealed by section 1 of, and the first schedule to, the Statute Law Revision Act 1894 (57 & 58 Vict. c. 54), which came into force on 25 August 1894.

The enactments which were repealed (whether for the whole or any part of the United Kingdom) by the act were repealed so far as they extended to the Isle of Man by section 1(1) of, and schedule 1 to, the Statute Law Revision (Isle of Man) Act 1991, which came into force on 25 July 1991.

The whole act was repealed by section 1(1) of, and group 1 of part IX of schedule 1 to, the Statute Law (Repeals) Act 1998, which came into force on 19 November 1998.

The act was retained for the Republic of Ireland by section 2(2)(a) of, and part 4 of schedule 1 to, the Statute Law Revision Act 2007, which came into force on 8 May 2007.

== Repealed enactments ==
Section 1 of the act repealed 468 enactments, listed in the schedule to the act, across six categories: (Note: The Note of the bill, unlike the schedule, gives commentary on each act, noting any earlier repeals and the reason for the new repeal.)

- Expired
- Spent
- Repealed in general terms
- Virtually repealed
- Superseded
- Obsolete

Section 1 of the act included several safeguards to ensure that the repeal does not negatively affect existing rights or ongoing legal matters. Specifically, any legal rights, privileges, or remedies already obtained under the repealed laws, as well as any legal proceedings or principles established by them, remain unaffected. Section 1 of the act also ensured that repealed enactments that have been incorporated into other laws would continue to have legal effect in those contexts. Moreover, the repeal would not revive any former rights, offices, or jurisdictions that had already been abolished.

Section 2 of the act provided that the Statute Law Revision Act 1874 (37 & 38 Vict. c. 35) was to be read and construed as if, in the entry in the schedule to that act relating to the Piracy Act 1837 (7 Will. 4. & 1 Vict. c. 88), the words "Section Six" and "Section Seven" had been substituted for the words "Section Four" and "Section Five" respectively.

Citation	Short title	Title	Extent of repeal
1 & 2 Vict. c. 1	Commissions of the Peace Continuance Act 1837	An Act to continue for Six Calendar Months all such Commissions of the Peace as would otherwise expire with the demise of His late Majesty King William the Fourth.—Reign of Her present Majesty.	The whole act.
1 & 2 Vict. c. 2	Civil List Act 1837	An Act for the Support of Her Majesty's Household, and of the Honour and Dignity of the Crown of the United Kingdom of Great Britain and Ireland.	Section Two from " or from " to " India Duties ". Section Three from " commence " to " fourth, and " and from " the first Charge " to " ensuing Quarter ". Section Four. Section Five from " and it " to " aforesaid ". Sections Sixteen and Eighteen.
1 & 2 Vict. c. 3	Slave Compensation Act 1837	An Act to carry into further Execution the Provisions of an Act for completing the full Payment of Compensation to Owners of Slaves upon the Abolition of Slavery.	The whole act.
1 & 2 Vict. c. 4	Quarter Sessions Act 1837	An Act to remove Doubts as to summoning Juries at adjourned Quarter Sessions of the Peace.	Section Two.
1 & 2 Vict. c. 8	Duchess of Kent's Annuity Act 1838	An Act to enable Her Majesty to grant an annual Sum to Her Royal Highness Princess Maria Louisa Victoria Duchess of Kent.	The whole act.
1 & 2 Vict. c. 11	Supply Act 1838	An Act to apply the Sum of Two Millions to the Service of the Year One thousand eight hundred and forty-three.	The whole act.
1 & 2 Vict. c. 12	Exchequer Bills Act 1838	An Act for raising the Sum of Eleven millions four hundred and thirteen thousand seven hundred and fifty Pounds by Exchequer Bills, for the Service of the Year One thousand eight hundred and forty-three.	The whole act.
1 & 2 Vict. c. 13	Waterford House of Industry Act 1838	An Act to enable the Grand Juries of the County and County of the City of Waterford to make Presentments at the Spring Assizes for the Year One thousand eight hundred and forty-three, for the House of Industry of the said Counties.	The whole act.
1 & 2 Vict. c. 14	Criminal Lunatics Act 1838	An Act to repeal so much of an Act of the Thirty-ninth and Fortieth Years of King George the Third as limits the Custody of such Persons as are certified to be insane to Twenty Years.	Sections One, Two to " repealed, and ", the words " after the passing of this Act "—" kept in Custody or " and " in Custody " (wherever such last-mentioned words occur)—from " to the Keeper " to " if hereafter appointed " and the words " in Custody for the Time of passing this Act, or shall be hereafter ". Sections Three, Six, and Seven.
1 & 2 Vict. c. 17	Mutiny Act 1838	An Act for punishing Mutiny and Desertion, and for the better Payment of the Army and their Quarters.	The whole act.
1 & 2 Vict. c. 18	Marine Mutiny Act 1838	An Act for the Regulation of Her Majesty's Royal Marine Forces while on Shore.	The whole act.
1 & 2 Vict. c. 19	Abolition of Slavery Act 1838	An Act to amend the Act for the Abolition of Slavery in the British Colonies.	The whole act.
1 & 2 Vict. c. 20	Queen Anne's Bounty Act 1838	An Act for the Consolidation of the Offices of First Fruits, Tenths, and Queen Anne's Bounty.	Section Two from " and that " to end of that Section. Section Fifteen. Section Sixteen to " Ripon, and ". Section Twenty-five. The Schedule.
1 & 2 Vict. c. 21	Supply (No. 2) Act 1838	An Act to apply the Sum of Eight millions out of the Consolidated Fund to the Service of the Year One thousand eight hundred and forty-three.	The whole act.
1 & 2 Vict. c. 23	Parsonages Act 1838	An Act to amend the Law for providing fit Houses for the beneficed Clergy.	Section Fifteen from " except " to end of that Section.
1 & 2 Vict. c. 24	Regency Act Amendment Act 1838	An Act to repeal Part of an Act,—Care and Guardianship of Her Person.	The whole act.
1 & 2 Vict. c. 26	Exchequer Bills (No. 2) Act 1838	An Act for raising the Sum of Thirteen Millions by Exchequer Bills for the Service of the Year One thousand eight hundred and forty-three.	The whole act.
1 & 2 Vict. c. 27	Criminal Lunatics (Ireland) Act 1838	An Act to continue for One Year the Exemption from Punishment of Offences by Insane Persons in Ireland.	Section Four from " and that " to end.
1 & 2 Vict. c. 28	Bread (Ireland) Act 1838	An Act to repeal the several Acts now in force relating to Bread to be sold in Ireland, and to provide other Regulations for the making and Sale of Bread, and for preventing the Adulteration of Meal, Flour, and Bread, in that Part of the United Kingdom called Ireland.	Section One. Section Eight, the words " and one Moiety of such Penalty " and the subsequent words " Penalty and ". Section Thirteen from " together " to " proper " and from " and the Residue " to " committed ". Section Sixteen from " and the Monies " to end of that Section. Section Twenty-six from " and every " to " Authority of this Act ", from " if the " to " done, or ", and from " or shall " to " aforesaid, ". Sections Twenty-eight, Twenty-nine, and Thirty-one.
1 & 2 Vict. c. 31	Sale of Church Patronages Belonging to Municipal Corporations Act 1838	An Act for facilitating the Sale of Church Patronage belonging to Municipal Corporations in certain Cases.	Section Five.
1 & 2 Vict. c. 32	Courts of Common Law, Sittings Act 1838	An Act to enable Her Majesty's Courts at Westminster to hold Sittings in Banc in Time of Vacation.	The whole act.
1 & 2 Vict. c. 33	Sugar Duties Act 1838	An Act for granting to Her Majesty, until the Fifth Day of July One thousand eight hundred and forty-four, certain Duties on Sugar imported into the United Kingdom for the Service of the Year One thousand eight hundred and forty-three.	The whole act.
1 & 2 Vict. c. 34	Party Processions (Ireland) Act 1838	An Act to continue for Five Years, and from thence until the End of the then next Session of Parliament, an Act of the Second and Third Years of the Reign of His late Majesty, to restrain for Five Years, in certain Cases, Party Processions in Ireland.	The whole act.
1 & 2 Vict. c. 36	Kingstown and Dublin Harbours Act 1838	An Act to amend further and to continue and to amend the Acts relating to the Harbour of Kingstown and the Post and Harbour of Dublin.	Sections One, Sixteen and Nineteen.
1 & 2 Vict. c. 37	Grand Jury (Ireland) Act 1838	An Act to empower the Foreman or any other Member of Grand Juries in Ireland to administer Oaths to Witnesses on Bills of Indictment.	Section Three.
1 & 2 Vict. c. 38	Vagrancy Act 1838	An Act to amend an Act for punishing idle and disorderly Persons and Rogues and Vagabonds.	Section Three.
1 & 2 Vict. c. 44	Glass Duties Act 1838	An Act to consolidate and amend the Laws for collecting and securing the Duties of Excise on Glass.	The whole act.
1 & 2 Vict. c. 46	Western Australia Government Act 1838	An Act to continue until the Thirty-first Day of December One thousand eight hundred and forty-four, the several Acts for regulating Turnpike Roads in Ireland.	The whole act.
1 & 2 Vict. c. 49	Government Annuities Act 1838	An Act to facilitate the Conveyance of certain Annuities and to amend the Acts relating to Life Annuities and Annuities for Terms of Years.	Section One. Section Nine from " the first " to end of that Section. Section Ten.
1 & 2 Vict. c. 50	Administration of Justice, New South Wales, etc. Act 1838	An Act to continue until the Thirty-first Day of December One thousand eight hundred and forty-four, an Act for the Administration of Justice in New South Wales and Van Diemen's Land.	The whole act.
1 & 2 Vict. c. 51	Grand Jury Cess Dublin Act 1838	An Act to amend the Laws relating to the Levy of Grand Jury Cess in the County of the City of Dublin.	Section One. Section Two from " according " to " Assessment, ". Sections Three to Six. Section Eight from " and such " to end of that Section. Sections Ten and Eleven.
1 & 2 Vict. c. 52	Linen Manufacturers, etc. (Ireland) Act 1838	An Act to continue for Five Years, and from thence until the End of the then next Session of Parliament, an Act of the Fifth and Sixth Years of His late Majesty, for the Regulation of the Linen and Hempen Manufactures in Ireland.	The whole act.
1 & 2 Vict. c. 53	County Treasurers (Ireland) Act 1838	An Act to amend an Act of the last Session of Parliament for providing more effectual Means to make Treasurers of Counties and Counties of Cities in Ireland account for Public Monies, and to secure the same.	Sections Four and Five.
1 & 2 Vict. c. 56	Poor Relief (Ireland) Act 1838	An Act for the more effectual Relief of the destitute Poor in Ireland.	Sections One, Two and Nine to Twelve. Section Thirteen, the words " or Assistant Commissioner, ". Section Eighteen from " Provided always " to end of that Section. Section Twenty-six from " shall order " to " Commissioners may ". Section Twenty-seven, the words " and Assistant Commissioners ". Sections Thirty-one, Thirty-six, Fifty-seven to Sixty-one, Sixty-three, Sixty-eight, Eighty-seven and Ninety-seven. Section Ninety-eight, the words " Assistant Commissioner, ". Section Ninety-nine, the words " or Assistant Commissioner, ". Sections One hundred and One hundred and two, the words " or Assistant Commissioners, ". Section One hundred and four, the words " or Assistant Commissioners, " and from " and the Penalties " to end of that Section. Sections One hundred and four and One hundred and eleven. Section One hundred and thirteen, the words " Assistant Commissioners, " from " and every " to " thereupon " and from " or shall " to " as aforesaid, ". Section One hundred and fourteen, the words " or Assistant Commissioners " and the words " or Rate " (wherever they occur). Sections One hundred and fifteen and One hundred and sixteen, the words " or Rate ". Sections One hundred and eighteen to One hundred and twenty-three. Section One hundred and twenty-four from " or Composition " to " in. Section One hundred and twenty-five. Sections One hundred and Thirty-two and Schedule.
1 & 2 Vict. c. 61	Government Offices Security Act 1838	An Act to amend an Act for enabling persons to make Deposits of Stock or Exchequer Bills in lieu of giving Security by Bond to the Postmaster General and Commissioners of Land Revenue, Customs, Excise, Stamps, and Taxes.	Section One from " and that so " to end of that Section.
1 & 2 Vict. c. 63	Dublin Police District Act 1838	An Act to amend the Acts relating to the Police of the District of the Dublin Metropolis.	The whole act.
1 & 2 Vict. c. 64	Tithe Act 1838	An Act to facilitate the Merger of Tithes in Land.	Section Seven.
1 & 2 Vict. c. 65	Local Commissioners Relief Act 1838	An Act for relieving the Commissioners and others acting in the Execution of divers Local Improvement Acts from certain Penalties and Disabilities.	The whole act.
1 & 2 Vict. c. 67	West Indian Prisons Act 1838	An Act for the better Government of Prisons in the West Indies.	Section Eleven. Repealed as to all Her Majesty's Dominions.
1 & 2 Vict. c. 68	Turnpike Acts Continuance Act 1838	An Act to continue until the First Day of June One thousand eight hundred and forty-four, and to the End of the then Session of Parliament, the Local Turnpike Acts for Great Britain which expire with this or the ensuing Session of Parliament.	The whole act.
1 & 2 Vict. c. 71	Arms and Gunpowder (Ireland) Act 1838	An Act to continue for Five Years, and from thence until the End of the then next Session of Parliament, the several Acts relating to the Importation and keeping of Arms and Gunpowder in Ireland.	The whole act.
1 & 2 Vict. c. 72	Turnpike Acts (Ireland) Act 1838	An Act to continue for One Year, and from thence until the End of the then next Session of Parliament, the several Acts for regulating the Turnpike Roads in Ireland.	The whole act.
1 & 2 Vict. c. 74	Small Tenements Recovery Act 1838	An Act to facilitate the Recovery of Possession of Tenements after due Determination of the Tenancy.	Section Nine.
1 & 2 Vict. c. 75	Fires Prevention Act 1838	An Act to amend an Act of the Fifth and Sixth Years, and to reduce the Duties of Excise on Spirits in the United Kingdom.	Sections Two and Three.
1 & 2 Vict. c. 80	Special Constables Act 1838	An Act for the Payment of Constables for keeping the Peace near Public Works.	Section Four.
1 & 2 Vict. c. 82	Parkhurst Prison Act 1838	An Act for establishing a Prison for young Offenders.	Section Nine to " extend; and ". Section Eighteen.
1 & 2 Vict. c. 86	Court of Session (No. 1) Act 1838	An Act to authorize Diligences against Deputies and Suspensions in the Court of Session in Scotland.	Sections One to Three, Seven, Eight, Ten and Twelve.
1 & 2 Vict. c. 88	Advances for Public Works Act 1838	An Act to authorize a further Issue of Exchequer Bills for Public Works and Fisheries and Employment of the Poor, and to amend the Acts relating thereto.	Except Section Eighteen.
1 & 2 Vict. c. 89	Drouly Fund Act 1838	An Act respecting the Transfer of certain Funds to the Secretary at War.	Section Three from " and the " to end of that Section.
1 & 2 Vict. c. 90	Militia Ballots Suspension Act 1838	An Act to suspend until the End of the next Session of Parliament the making of Lists and the Ballots and Enrolments for the Militia of the United Kingdom.	The whole act.
1 & 2 Vict. c. 91	Militia Pay Act 1838	An Act to defray the Charge of the Pay, Clothing, and contingent and other Expenses of the Disembodied Militia in Great Britain and Ireland; and for granting Allowances in certain Cases to Subaltern Officers, Adjutants, Paymasters, Quartermasters, Surgeons, Assistant Surgeons, Surgeons' Mates, and Serjeant Majors of the Militia, until the First Day of July One thousand eight hundred and forty-nine.	The whole act.
1 & 2 Vict. c. 92	Four and a Half per Cent Duties Repeal Act 1838	An Act to repeal the Four-and-a-half per Centum Duties.	The whole act.
1 & 2 Vict. c. 93	Exchequer Bills (No. 2) Act 1838	An Act for raising the Sum of Eleven million forty-four thousand five hundred and fifty Pounds by Exchequer Bills, for the Service of the Year One thousand eight hundred and forty-three.	The whole act.
1 & 2 Vict. c. 94	Public Record Office Act 1838	An Act for keeping safely the Public Records.	Section One from " and that " to end of that Section. Section Eight from " as are " to " Provisions of this Act, ". Section Nine from " and to " to " subsist, ". Sections Ten, Eighteen and Twenty-six.
1 & 2 Vict. c. 95	Pensions Act 1838	An Act to provide for the Payment of certain Pensions.	Sections Three and Five.
1 & 2 Vict. c. 96	Joint Stock Banks Act 1838	An Act to amend, until the End of the next Session of Parliament, the Law relative to Legal Proceedings by certain Joint Stock Banking Companies against their own Members, and by such Members against the Companies.	Section One from " at any Time during " to " this Act, ". Sections Five and Six.
1 & 2 Vict. c. 98	Railways (Conveyance of Mails) Act 1838	An Act to provide for the Conveyance of the Mails by Railways.	Section Twenty.
1 & 2 Vict. c. 100	Forms of Pleading Act 1838	An Act for continuing, under certain Limitations, the Powers given to the Judges for altering the Forms of Pleading in the Courts of Common Law at Westminster and elsewhere.	The whole act.
1 & 2 Vict. c. 103	Municipal Corporations (Ireland) Act 1838	An Act to restrain the Alienation of Corporate Property in certain Towns in Ireland.	The whole act.
1 & 2 Vict. c. 104	County of Clare Treasurer Act 1838	An Act to authorize the County of Clare to borrow Twenty thousand Pounds for Payment of Arrears due to the late Treasurer.	The whole act.
1 & 2 Vict. c. 106	Pluralities Act 1838	An Act to abridge the holding of Benefices in Plurality, and to make better Provision for the Residence of the Clergy.	Section One. Section Two, the words " Distance, joint yearly Value, and ". Section Three. Section Four from " nor shall any Spiritual Person hold together " to end of that Section. Sections Five, Eight, Twelve, Fourteen and Fifteen. Section Sixteen from " and the " to " Pounds, ". Section Thirty-seven from " or Principal " to " of this Act, ". Section Forty-six from " or " to " Act " and the words " shall have been or ". Section Fifty-four from " or " to " Third, ". Section Sixty-one. Section Eighty-two from " and that " to end of that Section. Section One hundred and ten from " except " to " also ". Section One hundred and twenty-three, the words " Master or ". Section One hundred and thirty-one from " and of " to " Chancellor, ".
1 & 2 Vict. c. 107	Church Building Act 1838	An Act to amend and render more effectual the Church Building Acts.	Sections One, Three to Five and Eleven.
1 & 2 Vict. c. 108	Ecclesiastical Appointments Suspension Act 1838	An Act for suspending until the First Day of August One thousand eight hundred and forty-four, and to the End of the then Session of Parliament, the Appointment to certain Dignities and Offices in Cathedral and Collegiate Churches, and to Sinecure Rectories.	The whole act.
1 & 2 Vict. c. 109	Tithe Rentcharge (Ireland) Act 1838	An Act to abolish Compositions for Tithes in Ireland, and to substitute Rent-charges in lieu thereof.	Section One from " provided that " to " permanent; and ", and from " save so " to end of that Section. Sections Two to Six. Section Eleven from " Provided nevertheless " to end of that Section. Sections Thirteen to Fifteen. Sections Sixteen and Seventeen, the words " or Exchequer in Ireland, " and " or the Chief or Second Remembrancer, ". Section Thirty, the words " or Exchequer in Ireland, ". Sections Thirty-three to Forty-eight and Fifty-five.
1 & 2 Vict. c. 110	Judgments Act 1838	An Act for abolishing Arrest on Mesne Process in Civil Actions, except in certain Cases; for extending the Remedies of Creditors against the Property of Debtors; and for amending the Laws for the Relief of Insolvent Debtors in England.	Section Eleven from " Provided also " to end of that Section. Section Twelve from " after " to " Act, ". Section Thirteen from " or in Cases " to " from the Time appointed for the Commencement of this Act, " and from " Provided also " to " Debt ". Section Sixteen. Section Eighteen from " and all Orders " to " of the Court of Review in Matters of Bankruptcy, " and from " and by " to " Bankruptcy, ". Section Nineteen, the words " in Bankruptcy or ". Section Twenty-one from " Provided also, that no Order directing " to end of that Section.
1 & 2 Vict. c. 111	Appropriation Act 1838	An Act to apply a Sum out of the Consolidated Fund, and the Surplus of Ways and Means, to the Service of the Year One thousand eight hundred and forty-three, and to appropriate the Supplies granted in this Session of Parliament.	The whole act.
1 & 2 Vict. c. 112	Indemnity to Certain Persons Act 1838	An Act for allowing to Upper Canada the Duties granted to Lower Canada by an Act passed in the present Session of Parliament, intituled An Act to make temporary Provision for the Government of Lower Canada.	The whole act.
1 & 2 Vict. c. 114	Debtors (Scotland) Act 1838	An Act to amend the Law of Scotland in Matters relating to Personal Diligence, Arrestments, and Poindings.	Sections Thirty-three, Thirty-four and Thirty-six.
1 & 2 Vict. c. 115	County Dublin Baronies Act 1838	An Act to amend an Act of the Sixth and Seventh Years of Her present Majesty, for regulating the Care and Treatment of Lunatics, and for the Provision to be made for the safe Custody of Persons of unsound Mind charged with Offences.	Section Two.
1 & 2 Vict. c. 118	Court of Session (No. 2) Act 1838	An Act to make certain Alterations in the Duties of the Lords Ordinary, and in the Establishment of the Clerks and Officers of the Court of Session and Court of Commissioners for Teinds in Scotland, and to reduce the Fees payable in those Courts.	Section Two from " and upon " to end of that Section. Section Three from " and that " to " such Rotation; ". Section Four from " Provided always " to end of that Section. Section Six to " present Issue Clerks, ". Section Nine from " and as much " to end of that Section. Section Eleven from " on this Head " to end of that Section. Section Fifteen from " that all Causes depending " to " formerly depended; " and from " may be " to " as well as ". Section Sixteen from " and so much " to end of that Section. Section Thirty-one and Thirty-two. Section Thirty-four from " and the whole " to end of that Section. Section Thirty-five.
1 & 2 Vict. c. 119	Sheriff Courts (Scotland) Act 1838	An Act to regulate the Constitution, Jurisdiction, and Forms of Process of Sheriff Courts in Scotland.	Sections One and Seven. Section Twenty-seven from " and provided also " to end of that Section. Sections Twenty-nine, Thirty-three and Thirty-six.
1 & 2 Vict. c. 120	Tin Duties Act 1838	An Act for the Abolition of the exclusive Privilege of printing on linen, woollen, calico, and certain other stuffs in Scotland, and for making Compensation to the Family of the late Mr. John Dunsmore in respect of such Abolition.	Except Sections Three to Five.
2 & 3 Vict. c. 1	Poor Relief (Ireland) Act 1839	An Act to amend an Act of the First and Second Year of Her present Majesty for the more effectual Relief of the destitute Poor in Ireland.	Section Ten.
2 & 3 Vict. c. 2	Supply Act 1839	An Act to apply the Sum of Two Millions to the Service of the Year One thousand eight hundred and thirty-nine.	The whole act.
2 & 3 Vict. c. 3	Tithe Arrears (Ireland) Act 1839	An Act to authorize the Commutation of the Composition, and to facilitate the Collection and Distribution of Tithe Rent-charge in Ireland, and to make further Provision for the same, and for other Purposes.	Except Section Three from " Provided always " to " to be established by virtue hereof " and Section Five.
2 & 3 Vict. c. 5	Mutiny Act 1839	An Act for punishing Mutiny and Desertion, and for the better Payment of the Army and their Quarters.	The whole act.
2 & 3 Vict. c. 6	Supply Act 1839	An Act to apply the Sum of Eight Millions out of the Consolidated Fund to the Service of the Year One thousand eight hundred and thirty-nine.	The whole act.
2 & 3 Vict. c. 7	Marine Mutiny Act 1839	An Act for the Regulation of Her Majesty's Royal Marine Forces while on shore.	The whole act.
2 & 3 Vict. c. 8	Exchequer Bills Act 1839	An Act for raising the Sum of Thirteen Millions by Exchequer Bills, for the Service of the Year One thousand eight hundred and thirty-nine.	The whole act.
2 & 3 Vict. c. 9	Episcopal Jurisdiction (England) Act 1839	An Act to suspend until the First Day of October One thousand eight hundred and forty-two the Appointment to certain Dignities and Offices in Cathedral and Collegiate Churches, and to Sinecure Rectories.	The whole act.
2 & 3 Vict. c. 11	Judgments Act 1839	An Act for the better Protection of Purchasers against Judgments, Crown Debts, Lis pendens, and Fiats in Bankruptcy.	Section One.
2 & 3 Vict. c. 16	Court of Pleas of Durham Act 1839	An Act for improving the Practice and Proceedings of the Court of Pleas of the County Palatine of Durham and Sadberge.	Sections One to Seven, Nine and Ten. Section Eleven from " shall subject " to " therefrom, or ". Section Twelve and Thirteen. Section Nineteen from " or Writ " to " as aforesaid, ", from " or such Sheriff " to " be had, ", the words " or Trial, " and from " and the Verdict " to end of that Section. Sections Twenty-one and Thirty-five to Thirty-eight. The Schedule. The following Sections from and after the first day of November 1875: Sections Eight, Thirteen to Fifteen, Thirty and Thirty-one.
2 & 3 Vict. c. 19	Waterford Hospital Act 1839	An Act to amend an Act of the Sixth and Seventh Years of His late Majesty, for rebuilding and improving the Town of Liverpool, in the County Palatine of Lancaster, and for certain other Purposes.	Sections Two to Four.
2 & 3 Vict. c. 21	Sugar Duties Act 1839	An Act for granting to Her Majesty, until the Fifth Day of July One thousand eight hundred and forty, certain Duties on Sugar imported into the United Kingdom, for the Service of the Year One thousand eight hundred and thirty-nine.	The whole act.
2 & 3 Vict. c. 22	Justices of Assize Act 1839	An Act to enable Justices of Assize on their Circuits to take Inquisition of all Pleas and Examinations which shall be brought before them without a Special Commission for that Purpose.	From and after the first day of November 1875.
2 & 3 Vict. c. 23	Duties on Paper Act 1839	An Act to consolidate and amend the Laws for collecting and securing the Duties on Paper made in the United Kingdom.	The whole act.
2 & 3 Vict. c. 26	Revival of Expired Laws, etc., Jamaica Act 1839	An Act to provide for the Enactment of certain Laws in the Island of Jamaica.	The whole act.
2 & 3 Vict. c. 27	Borough Courts (England) Act 1839	An Act for regulating the Proceedings in the Borough Courts of England and Wales.	Section Four.
2 & 3 Vict. c. 28	Borough Watch Rates Act 1839	An Act for more equally assessing and levying Watch Rates in certain Boroughs.	Section Three.
2 & 3 Vict. c. 31	Turnpike Acts Continuance Act 1839	An Act to continue until the First Day of June One thousand eight hundred and forty-one, and to the End of the then Session of Parliament, the Local Turnpike Acts in England and Wales which expire with this or the ensuing Session of Parliament.	The whole act.
2 & 3 Vict. c. 32	Soap Duties Act 1839	An Act to continue, until the End of the Session of Parliament next after the Thirty-first Day of May One thousand eight hundred and forty-one, certain of the Allowances of the Duty of Excise on Soap used in Manufactures.	The whole act.
2 & 3 Vict. c. 34	Courts of Judicature, India Act 1839	An Act to confirm certain Rules and Orders of the Supreme Courts of Judicature at Fort William and Madras; and to empower the same Courts, and the Supreme Court of Judicature of Bombay, to make Rules and Orders concerning Pleadings.	Repealed as to all Her Majesty's Dominions.
2 & 3 Vict. c. 36	Court of Session Act 1839	An Act to regulate the Duties to be performed by the Judges in the Supreme Courts of Scotland, and to increase the Salaries of certain of the said Judges.	Sections Four and Five. Section Nine to " Provided always, that ". Sections Fourteen and Sixteen.
2 & 3 Vict. c. 37	Usury Act 1839	An Act to amend, and extend until the First Day of January One thousand eight hundred and forty-two, the Operation of the Laws relating to Usury.	The whole act.
2 & 3 Vict. c. 40	Highways Act 1839	An Act for procuring Returns relative to the Highways and Turnpike Roads in England and Wales.	The whole act.
2 & 3 Vict. c. 43	Militia Ballots Suspension Act 1839	An Act to suspend until the End of the next Session of Parliament the making of Lists and the Ballots and Enrolments for the Militia of the United Kingdom.	The whole act.
2 & 3 Vict. c. 44	Timber Ships, British North America Act 1839	An Act to prevent, until the End of the next Session of Parliament, Ships clearing out from a British North American Port loading any Part of their Cargo of Timber upon Deck.	The whole act.
2 & 3 Vict. c. 45	Highway (Railway Crossings) Act 1839	An Act to amend an Act of the Fifth and Sixth Years of the Reign of His late Majesty King William the Fourth relating to Highways.	Section Three.
2 & 3 Vict. c. 47	Metropolitan Police Act 1839	An Act for further improving the Police in and near the Metropolis.	Section Three. Section Four to " of the said Act ". Section Six from " and " to end of that Section. Section Twenty. Section Twenty-one from " and that " to end of that Section. Section Twenty-four. Sections Thirty-nine and Forty, the word " usually " (wherever it occurs). Section Forty-four from " Provided " to end of that Section. Section Forty-nine. Section Fifty-six to " next ". Section Eighty.
2 & 3 Vict. c. 49	Church Building Act 1839	An Act to make better Provision for the Assignment of Ecclesiastical Districts to Churches or Chapels augmented by the Governors of the Bounty of Queen Anne; and for other Purposes.	Section One to " repealed; and ".
2 & 3 Vict. c. 50	Public Works (Ireland) Act 1839	An Act to extend and amend the Provisions of the Acts for the Extension and Promotion of Public Works in Ireland.	Sections One, Two, Seven, Twenty, Twenty-one and Twenty-seven.
2 & 3 Vict. c. 51	Pensions Act 1839	An Act to regulate the Payment and Assignment in certain Cases of Pensions granted for Service in Her Majesty's Army, Navy, Royal Marines, and Ordnance.	Sections One and Five.
2 & 3 Vict. c. 55	Ecclesiastical Preferments (England) Act 1839	An Act to suspend, until the First Day of October One thousand eight hundred and forty-two, certain Cathedral and other Ecclesiastical Preferments, and the Operation of the new Arrangement of Dioceses upon the existing Ecclesiastical Courts.	The whole act.
2 & 3 Vict. c. 56	Prisons Act 1839	An Act for the Amendment of the Law of Evidence.	Except Section Twenty-two and Section Twenty-three to " Law ", so far as they relate to indictments or places of confinement to which 28 & 29 Vict. c. 126. does not extend.
2 & 3 Vict. c. 57	Slave Trade Suppression Act 1839	An Act to continue, until Six Months after the Commencement of the next Session of Parliament, an Act of the last Session of Parliament, for authorizing Her Majesty to carry into immediate Execution, by Orders in Council any Treaties for the Suppression of the Slave Trade.	The whole act.
2 & 3 Vict. c. 58	Stannaries Act 1839	An Act to make further Provision for the Administration of Justice, and for improving the Practice and Proceedings, in the Courts of the Stannaries of Cornwall; and for the Prevention of Frauds by Workmen employed in Mines within the County of Cornwall.	The whole act.
2 & 3 Vict. c. 59	Militia Officers Act 1839	An Act for taking away the Exemption, except in certain Cases, of Officers of the Militia to serve as Sheriff.	Section One from " save " to end of that Section. Section Three.
2 & 3 Vict. c. 61	Shannon Navigation Act 1839	An Act for the Improvement of the Navigation of the River Shannon.	Sections One to Thirty-five. Section Sixty-nine from " and the Venue " to " by the Authority of this Act " and from " or shall " to " Place, ". Sections Seventy-two, Seventy-three and Seventy-five.
2 & 3 Vict. c. 62	Tithe Act 1839	An Act to explain and amend an Act for the Commutation of Tithes in England and Wales.	Section Thirty-eight.
2 & 3 Vict. c. 64	Militia Pay Act 1839	An Act to defray the Charge of the Pay, Clothing, and contingent and other Expenses of the Disembodied Militia in Great Britain and Ireland; and for granting Allowances in certain Cases to Subaltern Officers, Adjutants, Paymasters, Quartermasters, Surgeons, Assistant Surgeons, Surgeons' Mates, and Serjeant Majors of the Militia, until the First Day of July One thousand eight hundred and forty.	The whole act.
2 & 3 Vict. c. 67	Patents Act 1839	An Act to amend an Act of the Fifth and Sixth Years of the Reign of King William the Fourth, intituled An Act to amend the Law touching Letters Patent for Inventions.	Sections One and Three.
2 & 3 Vict. c. 68	Joint Stock Banking Companies Act 1839	An Act to continue until the Thirty-first Day of August One thousand eight hundred and forty, an Act for enabling Banking Companies to sue and be sued in the Name of their public Officers against their own Members, and by such Members against the Companies.	The whole act.
2 & 3 Vict. c. 69	Judges' Lodgings Act 1839	An Act to authorize the Purchase or building of Lodgings for the Judges of Assize on their Circuits.	Section Three.
2 & 3 Vict. c. 71	Metropolitan Police Courts Act 1839	An Act for regulating the Police Courts in the Metropolis.	Section Three from "of" to "such other", and from "and also every" to "or Offices". Section Four. Section Nine from "the first" to "Act;" and so far as the rest of that section relates to the amounts of the salaries of the chief magistrate and receiver. Section Twelve. Section Forty-five, the words "continued or". Sections Fifty-four and Fifty-seven.
2 & 3 Vict. c. 72	Assizes Act 1839	An Act for enabling Justices of Assize and Nisi Prius, Oyer and Terminer and Gaol Delivery, to try Offences for Counties at large in adjoining Counties of Cities and Towns, and conversely.	Section Two.
2 & 3 Vict. c. 74	Unlawful Societies (Ireland) Act 1839	An Act to extend and render more effectual for Five Years, and from thence to the End of the then next Session of Parliament, an Act of the First Year of Her present Majesty, for preventing the administering and taking unlawful Oaths in Ireland.	Sections Five and Six.
2 & 3 Vict. c. 75	Constabulary (Ireland) Act 1839	An Act for the better Regulation of the Constabulary Force in Ireland.	Section Ten from " Provided " to end of that Section. Sections Twenty-five, Twenty-nine and Thirty-one.
2 & 3 Vict. c. 76	Municipal Corporations (Ireland) Act 1839	An Act to restrain the Alienation of Corporate Property in certain Towns in Ireland until the First Day of September One thousand eight hundred and forty.	The whole act.
2 & 3 Vict. c. 77	Assaults (Ireland) Act 1839	An Act for the better Prevention and Punishment of Assaults in Ireland for Five Years.	The whole act.
2 & 3 Vict. c. 78	Dublin Police Act 1839	An Act to make further Provisions relating to the Police in the District of Dublin Metropolis.	Sections One to Ten. Section Thirteen from " and such " to " Evidence, ". Section Eighteen. The Schedule.
2 & 3 Vict. c. 81	Highway Rates Act 1839	An Act to authorize for One Year, and from thence to the End of the then next Session of Parliament, the Application of a Portion of the Highway Rates to Turnpike Roads in certain Cases.	The whole act.
2 & 3 Vict. c. 82	Counties (Detached Parts) Act 1839	An Act for the better Administration of Justice in detached Parts of Counties.	Section Four.
2 & 3 Vict. c. 83	Poor Law Commission Act 1839	An Act to continue the Poor Law Commission until the Fourteenth Day of August One thousand eight hundred and forty, and thenceforth until the End of the then next Session of Parliament.	The whole act.
2 & 3 Vict. c. 84	Poor Rate Act 1839	An Act to amend the Laws relating to the Assessment and Collection of Rates for the Relief of the Poor.	Sections Four and Five.
2 & 3 Vict. c. 85	Bastard Children Act 1839	An Act to empower Justices of the Peace in Petty Sessions to make Orders for the Support of Bastard Children.	The whole act.
2 & 3 Vict. c. 87	Manchester Police Act 1839	An Act for improving the Police in Manchester for Two Years, and from thence until the End of the then next Session of Parliament.	The whole act.
2 & 3 Vict. c. 88	Birmingham Police Act 1839	An Act for improving the Police in Birmingham for Two Years, and from thence until the End of the then next Session of Parliament.	The whole act.
2 & 3 Vict. c. 89	Appropriation Act 1839	An Act to apply a Sum out of the Consolidated Fund, and the Surplus of Ways and Means, to the Service of the Year One thousand eight hundred and thirty-nine, and to appropriate the Supplies granted in this Session of Parliament.	The whole act.
2 & 3 Vict. c. 90	Exchequer Act 1839	An Act for raising the Sum of Twelve millions twenty-six thousand and fifty Pounds by Exchequer Bills, for the Service of the Year One thousand eight hundred and thirty-nine.	The whole act.
2 & 3 Vict. c. 92	Fines and Penalties (Ireland) Act 1839	An Act to explain and amend an Act of the First and Second Years of Her present Majesty, so far as relates to Fines and Penalties levied under the Revenue Laws in Ireland.	The whole act.
2 & 3 Vict. c. 93	County Police Act 1839	An Act for the Establishment of County and District Constables by the Authority of Justices of the Peace.	Section One. Section Three from " or " to " which ". Section Five, the words " the Adoption of this Act, or ". Sections Nineteen, Twenty-one and Twenty-two. Section Twenty-three from " and if " to " under this Act, " and the words " not so appointed ". Section Twenty-five from " and all " to " been made ". Sections Twenty-six and Twenty-nine.
2 & 3 Vict. c. 95	Bolton Police Act 1839	An Act for improving the Police in Bolton for Two Years, and from thence until the End of the then next Session of Parliament.	The whole act.
2 & 3 Vict. c. 96	Fisheries, Convention with France Act 1839	An Act to authorize Her Majesty, until Six Months after the Commencement of the then next Session of Parliament, to carry into effect a Convention between Her Majesty and the King of the French relative to the Fisheries on the Coasts of the British Islands and of France.	The whole act.
3 & 4 Vict. c. 1	Naturalization of Prince Albert Act 1840	An Act for exhibiting a Bill in this present Parliament for naturalizing His Serene Highness Prince Albert of Saxe Coburg and Gotha.	The whole act.
3 & 4 Vict. c. 3	Prince Albert's Annuity Act 1840	An Act for granting an Annuity to His Serene Highness Prince Albert of Saxe Coburg and Gotha.	The whole act.
3 & 4 Vict. c. 4	Supply Act 1840	An Act to apply the Sum of Two Millions to the Service of the Year One thousand eight hundred and forty.	The whole act.
3 & 4 Vict. c. 5	Horse Racing Act 1840	An Act to repeal so much of an Act passed in the Thirteenth Year of His late Majesty King George the Third, intituled an Act for establishing certain Regulations for the better Management of the Affairs of the East India Company, as well in India as in Europe, as relates to the Subject of Horse Racing.	The whole act.
3 & 4 Vict. c. 6	Mutiny Act 1840	An Act for punishing Mutiny and Desertion, and for the better Payment of the Army and their Quarters.	The whole act.
3 & 4 Vict. c. 7	Supply Act 1840	An Act to apply the Sum of Eight Millions out of the Consolidated Fund to the Service of the Year One thousand eight hundred and forty.	The whole act.
3 & 4 Vict. c. 8	Marine Mutiny Act 1840	An Act for the Regulation of Her Majesty's Royal Marine Forces while on shore.	The whole act.
3 & 4 Vict. c. 10	Advances for Public Works Act 1840	An Act to authorize the Issue of Exchequer Bills for Public Works and Fisheries and Employment of the Poor.	Except Section Fourteen to " accordingly, " and from " to any Person or Persons, Body or Bodies Politic or Corporate, or Company or Companies, in " to end of that Section.
3 & 4 Vict. c. 12	Exchequer Bills Act 1840	An Act for raising the Sum of Thirteen Millions by Exchequer Bills, for the Service of the Year One thousand eight hundred and forty.	The whole act.
3 & 4 Vict. c. 13	Tithes (Ireland) Act 1840	An Act to amend an Act of the First and Second Years of the Reign of Her present Majesty, to abolish Compositions for Tithes in Ireland, and to substitute Rent-charges in lieu thereof.	The whole act.
3 & 4 Vict c. 14	Insolvent Debtors (Ireland) Act 1840	An Act to continue for One Year, and to the End of the next Session of Parliament, the Acts for the Relief of Insolvent Debtors in Ireland.	The whole act.
3 & 4 Vict c. 15	Tithe Act 1840	An Act further to explain and amend the Acts for the Commutation of Tithes in England and Wales Sections Two and Thirty.	The whole act.
3 & 4 Vict c. 17	Excise Act 1840	An Act for granting to Her Majesty Duties of Customs, Excise, and Assessed Taxes.	Except Section One to "throughout the United Kingdom," and Section Six so far as such Sections relate to the additional duty or charge of £5 per centum upon the produce and amount of the duties of excise.
3 & 4 Vict c. 18	Tobacco Act 1840	An Act to discontinue the Excise Survey on Tobacco, and to provide other Regulations in lieu thereof Sections One, Sixteen and Seventeen.	The whole act.
3 & 4 Vict c. 19	Customs Act 1840	An Act for granting to Her Majesty an additional Duty of Customs on Timber.	The whole act.
3 & 4 Vict c. 20	Queen Anne's Bounty Act 1840	An Act the title of which begins with the words,—An Act to amend an Act passed in the First Year,—and ends with the words,—Agreements which have been made in pursuance of the said Act; and for other Purposes.	Section One.
3 & 4 Vict c. 22	Duties on Glass Act 1840	An Act to impose upon Broad or Spread Glass the same Duties of Excise that are payable upon German Sheet Glass.	The whole act.
3 & 4 Vict c. 23	Sugar Duties Act 1840	An Act for granting to Her Majesty, until the Fifth Day of July One thousand eight hundred and forty-one, certain Duties on Sugar imported into the United Kingdom, for the Service of the Year One thousand eight hundred and forty.	The whole act.
3 & 4 Vict c. 24	Costs of Action of Trespass Act 1840	An Act the title of which begins with the words,—An Act to repeal Part of an Act of the Forty-third Year of the Reign of Queen Elizabeth,—and ends with the words,—further Provisions in lieu thereof.	Section One. Section Two, the words "Writ of Trial or".
3 & 4 Vict c. 26	Evidence Act 1840	An Act to remove Doubts as to the Competency of Persons, being rated Inhabitants of any Parish, to give Evidence in certain Cases.	The whole act.
3 & 4 Vict c. 27	Scotch and Irish Paupers Act 1840	An Act the title of which begins with the words,—An Act to continue to the First Day of August,—and ends with the words,—Persons born in Scotland and Ireland, and chargeable to Parishes in England.	The whole act.
3 & 4 Vict c. 30	Manchester Police Act 1840	An Act for the more equal Assessment of Police Rates in Manchester, Birmingham, and Bolton, and to make better Provision for the Police in Birmingham, for One Year, and to the End of the then next Session of Parliament.	The whole act.
3 & 4 Vict c. 31	Inclosure Act 1840	An Act to extend the Powers and Provisions of the several Acts relating to the Inclosure of Open and Arable Fields in England and Wales.	Section Six.
3 & 4 Vict c. 32	Importation Act 1840	An Act to continue for One Year, and from thence until the End of the then next Session of Parliament, the several Acts relating to the Importation and keeping of Arms and Gunpowder in Ireland.	The whole act.
3 & 4 Vict c. 33	Importation Act 1840	An Act the title of which begins with the words,—An Act to make certain Provisions and Regulations,—and ends with the words,—Bishops and Clergy other than those of the United Church of England and Ireland.	Section Seven from "Provided" to end of that Section.
3 & 4 Vict. c. 35	British North America Act 1840	An Act to re-unite the Provinces of Upper and Lower Canada, and for the Government of Canada.	Except Sections Twenty-eight, Twenty-nine and Sixty.
3 & 4 Vict. c. 36	Timber Ships, British North America Act 1840	An Act for preventing Ships clearing out from a British North American Port loading any Part of their Cargo of Timber upon Deck.	The whole act.
3 & 4 Vict. c. 37	Mutiny, East Indies Act 1840	An Act to consolidate and amend the Laws for punishing Mutiny and Desertion of Officers and Soldiers in the Service of the East India Company.	Repealed as to all Her Majesty's Dominions.
3 & 4 Vict. c. 39	Turnpikes Act 1840	An Act to authorize Trustees or Commissioners of Turnpike Roads to appoint Meetings for executing their Trusts in certain Cases.	Sections One and Three.
3 & 4 Vict. c. 40	West India Islands Relief Act 1840	An Act to amend Two Acts of His late Majesty King William the Fourth, for the Relief of certain of Her Majesty's Colonies and Plantations in the West Indies.	Section Ten.
3 & 4 Vict. c. 42	Poor Law Commission Act 1840	An Act to continue the Poor Law Commission until the Thirty-first Day of December One thousand eight hundred and forty-one.	The whole act.
3 & 4 Vict. c. 44	Prisons (Ireland) Act 1840	An Act to amend an Act of the Seventh Year of King George the Fourth, for consolidating and amending the Laws relating to Prisons in Ireland.	Section Six.
3 & 4 Vict. c. 45	Turnpike Acts Continuance Act 1840	An Act to continue,—Local Turnpike Acts for Great Britain which expire with this or the ensuing Session of Parliament.	The whole act.
3 & 4 Vict. c. 46	Turnpike Acts, Ireland, Continuance Act 1840	An Act to continue for One Year from the passing of this Act, and thenceforth until the End of the then next Session of Parliament, the several Acts for regulating the Turnpike Roads in Ireland.	The whole act.
3 & 4 Vict. c. 47	Parliamentary Elections Act 1840	An Act to repeal so much of an Act of the Ninth Year of the Reign of Her late Majesty Queen Anne as prevents the Re-election of Mayors of Parliamentary Boroughs and other annual Returning Officers.	The whole act.
3 & 4 Vict. c. 48	Entail Sites Act 1840	An Act to enable Proprietors of Entailed Estates in Scotland to feu or lease on long Leases Portions of the same for the building of Churches and Schools, and for Dwelling Houses and Gardens for the Ministers and Masters thereof.	Section Eight.
3 & 4 Vict. c. 50	Canals (Offences) Act 1840	An Act to provide for keeping the Peace on Canals and Navigable Rivers.	Section Fifteen from "and all" to end of that Section. Section Twenty-one.
3 & 4 Vict. c. 52	Regency Act 1840	An Act to provide for the Administration of the Government in case the Crown should descend to any Issue of Her Majesty whilst such Issue shall be under the Age of Eighteen Years, and for the Care and Guardianship of such Issue.	The whole act.
3 & 4 Vict. c. 53	Newgate Gaol, Dublin Act 1840	An Act for vacating any Presentment for rebuilding the Gaol of Newgate in Dublin, and vacating any Contract between the Commissioners for rebuilding the said Gaol and the Contractor.	The whole act.
3 & 4 Vict. c. 54	Insane Prisoners Act 1840	An Act for making further Provision for the Confinement and Maintenance of Insane Prisoners.	Section Two from "and in" to "confined;". Section Three from "and in all" to "acquitted on the Ground of Insanity;". Section Six. Section Seven from "so much of the said Act as relates to such Directions" to "that". Section Ten.
3 & 4 Vict. c. 56	East India Trade Act 1840	An Act further to regulate the Trade of Ships built and trading within the Limits of the East India Company's Charter.	Sections One to Seven. Repealed as to all Her Majesty's Dominions.
3 & 4 Vict. c. 59	Evidence (Scotland) Act 1840	An Act for the Amendment of the Law of Evidence in Scotland.	Section Five.
3 & 4 Vict. c. 60	Church Building Act 1840	An Act to further amend the Church Building Acts.	Section Six, the words "enrolled and". Sections Eight to Eleven, Thirteen, Fourteen and Twenty.
3 & 4 Vict. c. 61	Beerhouse Act 1840	An Act to amend the Acts relating to the general Sale of Beer and Cider by Retail in England.	Section Fourteen. Section Eighteen from "nor" to "recited Acts;" and from "on the" to "aforesaid,".
3 & 4 Vict. c. 65	Admiralty Court Act 1840	An Act to improve the Practice and extend the Jurisdiction of the High Court of Admiralty of England.	Sections Ten and Twenty-four.
3 & 4 Vict. c. 66	High Court of Admiralty (England) Act 1840	An Act to make Provision for the Judge, Registrar, and Marshal of the High Court of Admiralty of England.	Section One, the words "after the present Parliament,". Section Two to "and that"; and from "out" to "mentioned,". Section Three to "Admiral, as the Case may be; and". Section Four to "Act, and". Section Five from "out" to "mentioned". Section Six from "and the Salaries" to end of that Section. Section Ten, the words "being a Proctor of the said Court,". Section Eleven from "being" to "said Court," and from "be paid" to "and".
3 & 4 Vict. c. 69	Fisheries, Convention with France Act 1840	An Act to continue, for Six Months,—Fisheries on the Coasts of the British Islands and of France.	The whole act.
3 & 4 Vict. c. 70	Militia Pay Act 1840	An Act to defray the Charge of the Pay,—Militia, until the First Day of July One thousand eight hundred and forty-one.	The whole act.
3 & 4 Vict. c. 71	Militia Ballots Suspension Act 1840	An Act to suspend until the End of the next Session of Parliament the making of Lists and the Ballots and Enrolments for the Militia of the United Kingdom.	The whole act.
3 & 4 Vict. c. 72	Marriage Act 1840	An Act to provide for the Solemnization of Marriages in the Districts in or near which the Parties reside.	Section Six.
3 & 4 Vict. c. 77	Grammar Schools Act 1840	An Act for improving the Condition and extending the Benefits of Grammar Schools.	Section Twenty-six.
3 & 4 Vict. c. 78	Clergy Reserves in Canada Act 1840	An Act to provide for the Sale of the Clergy Reserves in the Province of Canada, and for the Distribution of the Proceeds thereof.	Sections Eleven and Thirteen. Repealed as to all Her Majesty's Dominions.
3 & 4 Vict. c. 80	Insolvent Debtors, India Act 1840	An Act to continue until the First Day of March One thousand eight hundred and forty-two, and from thence to the End of the then next Session of Parliament, the several Acts relating to Insolvent Debtors in India.	The whole act.
3 & 4 Vict. c. 83	Usury Act 1840	An Act the title of which begins with the words,—An Act to continue—and ends with the words,—excepting certain Bills of Exchange and Promissory Notes from the Operation of the Laws relating to Usury.	The whole act.
3 & 4 Vict. c. 84	Metropolitan Police Courts Act 1840	An Act for better defining the Powers of Justices within the Metropolitan Police District.	Section One. Section Ten so far as it relates to returns and Lists under 43 Geo. 3. Sections Fourteen and Sixteen.
3 & 4 Vict. c. 85	Chimney Sweepers and Chimneys Regulation Act 1840	An Act for the Regulation of Chimney Sweepers and Chimneys.	Section One. Section Two to "and forty-two," and the words "or less than Five Pounds." Section Three from "from" to "Act" and the words "after such Date". Sections Four, Five, Nine and Thirteen.
3 & 4 Vict. c. 86	Church Discipline Act 1840	An Act for better enforcing Church Discipline.	Section One. Section Sixteen from "now" to "hereafter". Section Twenty-six.
3 & 4 Vict. c. 88	County Police Act 1840	An Act to amend the Act for the Establishment of County and District Constables.	Section Three to "and that,". Section Five to "Provided,". Section Eight from "in which" to "force," and from "upon" to "Rates;". Sections Twenty-nine and Thirty. Section Thirty-five from "Provided" to end of that Section. Section Thirty-six.
3 & 4 Vict. c. 89	Poor Rate Exemption Act 1840	An Act to exempt, until the Thirty-first Day of December One thousand eight hundred and forty-one, certain Inhabitants of Parishes, Townships, and Villages from Liability to be rated as such, in respect of Stock in Trade or other Property, to the Relief of the Poor.	Section Two.
3 & 4 Vict. c. 91	Textile Manufactures (Ireland) Act 1840	An Act the title of which begins with the words,—An Act for the more effectual Prevention of Frauds and Abuses—and ends with the words,—next Session of Parliament.	Sections One, Twelve and Twenty-nine. Section Thirty-two so far as it relates to plea of general issue. Section Thirty-five from "and shall commence to end of that Section".
3 & 4 Vict. c. 92	Non-parochial Registers Act 1840	An Act for enabling Courts of Justice to admit Non-parochial Registers as Evidence of Births or Baptisms, Deaths or Burials, and Marriages.	Sections One from "Provided" to end of that Section. Section Seven from "according" to end of that Section. Sections Eighteen, Nineteen and Twenty-one.
3 & 4 Vict. c. 93	Ecclesiastical Courts Act 1840	An Act to amend the Act for the better Regulation of Ecclesiastical Courts in England.	Section Three.
3 & 4 Vict. c. 94	Court of Chancery Act 1840	An Act for facilitating the Administration of Justice in the Court of Chancery.	The whole act.
3 & 4 Vict. c. 95	Customs Act 1840	An Act to enable Her Majesty to carry into effect certain Stipulations contained in a Treaty—Purposes of Trade with Her Majesty's Dominions, as the National Ports of such States.	Repealed as to all Her Majesty's Dominions.
3 & 4 Vict. c. 96	Post Office (Duties) Act 1840	An Act for the Regulation of the Duties of Postage.	Sections Four and Twenty-eight. Section Thirty-eight from "and all" to end of that Section. Section Forty-three from "and thereupon" to "Table,". Sections Sixty-eight and Sixty-nine. Section Seventy, the words "or any Three of them" (wherever they occur). Sections Seventy-two and Seventy-three. Repealed as to all Her Majesty's Dominions.
3 & 4 Vict. c. 98	Highway Rates Act 1840	An Act to authorize, for a limited Time, the Application of a Portion of the Highway Rates to Turnpike Roads in certain Townships and Districts.	The whole act.
3 & 4 Vict. c. 99	Census (Great Britain) Act 1840	An Act for taking an Account of the Population of Great Britain.	The whole act.
3 & 4 Vict. c. 100	Census (Ireland) Act 1840	An Act for taking an Account of the Population of Ireland.	The whole act.
3 & 4 Vict. c. 102	Court Houses (Ireland) Act 1840	An Act to amend the Law relating to Court Houses in Ireland.	Section Eight.
3 & 4 Vict. c. 103	Dublin Justices Act 1840	An Act to amend an Act of the last Session for making further Provisions relating to the Police in the District of Dublin Metropolis.	Section One.
3 & 4 Vict. c. 105	Debtors (Ireland) Act 1840	An Act for abolishing Arrest on Mesne Process in Civil Actions, except in certain Cases; for extending the Remedies of Creditors against the Property of Debtors; and for the further Amendment of the Law and the better Advancement of Justice in Ireland.	Sections Six and Nineteen. Sections Twenty-one, Twenty-three, Twenty-four and Twenty-seven so far as they relate to the Court of Exchequer. Section Seventy-seven from "and all Powers given to or Duties directed to be performed by the Court" to "same Court;". Section Seventy-nine.
3 & 4 Vict. c. 106	Exchequer Bills Act 1840	An Act for raising the Sum of Ten millions seven hundred fifty-one thousand five hundred and fifty Pounds by Exchequer Bills, for the Service of the Year One thousand eight hundred and forty.	The whole act.
3 & 4 Vict. c. 108	Municipal Corporations (Ireland) Act 1840	An Act for the Regulation of Municipal Corporations in Ireland.	Sections Seventy-five to Eighty, Ninety-six, Ninety-seven and One hundred and one. Section One hundred and five to "passed; and". Sections One hundred and six and One hundred and seven. Section One hundred and thirty-nine so far as it relates to the Court of Exchequer. Sections One hundred and forty-three to One hundred and forty-five, One hundred and forty-seven to One hundred and forty-nine, and One hundred and fifty-one. Section One hundred and fifty-two from "and until" to end of that Section. Section One hundred and seventy from "Provided also" to end of that Section. Section One hundred and seventy-one, One hundred and seventy-two and One hundred and seventy-four. Section One hundred and seventy-six from "Provided" to end of that Section. Sections One hundred and seventy-eight, One hundred and eighty-two, One hundred and eighty-seven and One hundred and eighty-eight. Section One hundred and eighty-nine from "Provided" to end of that Section. Section One hundred and ninety-nine from "and no Person" to "such Borough Fund;". Section Two hundred and four from "and in" to "thereupon;". Sections Two hundred and six to Two hundred and twelve, and Two hundred and seventeen.
3 & 4 Vict. c. 109	Counties and Boroughs (Ireland) Act 1840	An Act to annex certain parts of certain Counties of Cities,—Alienation of Corporate Property in Ireland.	Section One from "Provided nevertheless" to "longer;". Sections Two to Seven, Eleven to Thirteen, and Fifteen.
3 & 4 Vict. c. 110	Loan Societies Act 1840	An Act to amend the Laws relating to Loan Societies.	Sections One, Two, Twenty-five, Thirty and Thirty-one.
3 & 4 Vict. c. 111	Joint Stock Companies Act 1840	An Act to continue,—Legal Proceedings by certain Joint Stock Banking Companies against their own Members, and by such Members against the Companies.	Section One. Section Two from "shall steal" to "Copartnership, or".
3 & 4 Vict. c. 112	Appropriation Act 1840	An Act to apply a Sum out of the Consolidated Fund to the Service of the Year One thousand eight hundred and forty, and to appropriate the Supplies granted in this Session of Parliament.	The whole act.
3 & 4 Vict. c. 113	Ecclesiastical Commissioners Act 1840	An Act to carry into effect, with certain Modifications, the Fourth Report of the Commissioners of Ecclesiastical Duties and Revenues.	Sections Nineteen, Thirty-eight, Forty and Sixty. Section Sixty-six so far as it relates to the collegiate church of Manchester. Section Eighty-one to "repealed; and". Sections Ninety-two and Ninety-four. The Schedule so far as it relates to Saint David's and Llandaff.
4 & 5 Vict. c. 2	Mutiny Act 1841	An Act for punishing Mutiny and Desertion, and for the better Payment of the Army and their Quarters.	The whole act.
4 & 5 Vict. c. 3	Marine Mutiny Act 1841	An Act for the Regulation of Her Majesty's Royal Marine Forces while on shore.	The whole act.
4 & 5 Vict. c. 4	Supply Act 1841	An Act to apply the Sum of Eight Millions out of the Consolidated Fund to the Service of the Year One thousand eight hundred and forty-one.	The whole act.
4 & 5 Vict. c. 5	Tithe Compositions (Ireland) Act 1841	An Act to facilitate the Recovery of Arrears of Tithe Compositions in Ireland,—substituting Rentcharges in lieu thereof.	The whole act.
4 & 5 Vict. c. 6	Turnpike Roads (Ireland) Act 1841	An Act to continue, until the Fourth Day of August,—and to amend the Acts for regulating Turnpike Roads in Ireland.	The whole act.
4 & 5 Vict. c. 7	Census Act 1841	An Act to amend the Acts of the last Session for taking Account of the Population.	The whole act.
4 & 5 Vict. c. 8	Duties on Rum, etc. Act 1841	An Act to reduce the Duty on Rum and Rum Shrub the Produce of and imported from certain British Possessions in the East Indies into the United Kingdom.	The whole act.
4 & 5 Vict. c. 9	Turnpike Acts Continuance Act 1841	An Act for removing Doubts as to the Continuance of certain Local Turnpike Acts.	The whole act.
4 & 5 Vict. c. 14	Trading Partnerships Act 1841	An Act to make good certain Contracts which have been or may be entered into by certain Banking and other Copartnerships.	Sections Two and Three.
4 & 5 Vict. c. 17	Arrest in Personal Actions (Ireland) Act 1841	An Act to abolish Arrest in personal Actions commenced by Process of Subpoena at the Law Side of the Court of Exchequer in Ireland.	The whole act.
4 & 5 Vict. c. 19	Exchequer Bills Act 1841	An Act for raising the Sum of Eleven Millions by Exchequer Bills, for the Service of the Year One thousand eight hundred and forty-one.	The whole act.
4 & 5 Vict. c. 20	Excise Management Act 1841	An Act to alter and amend certain Laws relating to the Collection and Management of the Duties of Excise.	Sections Eight to Fourteen. Section Nineteen from "under the" to "Westminster, and". Sections Twenty-two, Twenty-three, Twenty-five and Thirty-five.
4 & 5 Vict. c. 21	Conveyance by Release Without Lease Act 1841	An Act for rendering a Release as effectual for the Conveyance of Freehold Estates as a Lease and Release by the same Parties.	The whole act.
4 & 5 Vict. c. 22	Felony Act 1841	An Act to remove Doubts as to the Liability of Lords and Peers of Parliament to Punishment in certain Cases of Felony.	To "and that".
4 & 5 Vict. c. 23	Militia Ballots Suspension Act 1841	An Act to suspend until the Thirty-first Day of August One thousand eight hundred and forty-two the making of Lists and the Ballots and Enrolments for the Militia of the United Kingdom.	The whole act.
4 & 5 Vict. c. 24	Entailed Lands, etc. (Scotland) Act 1841	An Act to amend an Act to grant certain Powers to Heirs of Entail in Scotland, and to authorize the Sale of Entailed Lands for the Payment of certain Debts affecting the same.	The whole act.
4 & 5 Vict. c. 28	Frivolous Suits Act 1841	An Act to prevent Plaintiffs in certain frivolous Actions from obtaining their full Costs of Suit.	The whole act.
4 & 5 Vict. c. 29	Sugar Duties Act 1841	An Act for granting to Her Majesty, until the Fifth Day of July One thousand eight hundred and forty-two, certain Duties on Sugar imported into the United Kingdom, for the Service of the Year One thousand eight hundred and forty-one.	The whole act.
4 & 5 Vict. c. 30	Ordnance Survey Act 1841	An Act to authorize and facilitate the Completion of a Survey of Great Britain, Berwick upon Tweed, and the Isle of Man.	Sections Eighteen and Nineteen.
4 & 5 Vict. c. 31	Court Houses (Ireland) Act 1841	An Act to provide for the Surrender of Premises formerly used for Court Houses, but no longer used for that Purpose, in Ireland.	The whole act.
4 & 5 Vict. c. 35	Copyhold Act 1841	An Act for the Commutation of certain Manorial Rights in respect of Lands of Copyhold and Customary Tenure, and in respect of other Lands subject to such Rights, and for facilitating the Enfranchisement of such Lands, and for the Improvement of such Tenure.	Section Six. Section Seven so far as it relates to the amount of the salary of a commissioner. Sections Twelve to Nineteen, Twenty-three to Thirty-two, and Thirty-four. Section Thirty-six from "the first Payment (except" to "Rights as aforesaid;". Sections Thirty-seven and Thirty-eight. Section Forty-three so far as it relates to any commutation therein referred to. Section Forty-four from "or in" to "before the said Commissioners or Assistant Commissioner," and so far as the rest of that Section relates to any objection. Section Fifty-one. Section Fifty-two from "but" to "or good Behaviour;", from "and whenever" to "interested therein:" and so far as the rest of that Section relates to the commencement of a rentcharge or to a schedule of apportionment. Section Fifty-six from "and whenever" to "of the Case;", from "and every" to "interested therein:", from "when such" to "aforesaid, or", the words "confirming such Apportionment, or" and "their Confirmation of the Apportionment, or", and so far as the rest of that Section relates to a schedule of apportionment. Section Fifty-seven to "fit,". Section Fifty-eight so far as it relates to a schedule of apportionment. Sections Sixty to Sixty-three. Sections Sixty-five to Sixty-seven so far as they relate to a schedule of apportionment. Sections Sixty-eight to Seventy-one. Section Seventy-three from "subject" to "mentioned," and from "writing" to "Record;". Section Seventy-eight from "and for" to end of that Section. Section Ninety-three, the words "Award, Schedule of Apportionment,". Section One hundred and one. Section One hundred and two from "the Words "Land"" to "therein;".
4 & 5 Vict. c. 37	Tithe Compositions (Ireland) Act 1841	An Act for the more easy Recovery of Arrears of Compositions for Tithes from Persons of the Persuasion of the People called Quakers, in Ireland.	The whole act.
4 & 5 Vict. c. 38	School Sites Act 1841	An Act to afford further Facilities for the Conveyance and Endowment of Sites for Schools.	Sections One, Four and Sixteen. Section Twenty-one from "an Act passed" to "Scotland, or". Section Twenty-three.
4 & 5 Vict. c. 39	Ecclesiastical Commissioners Act 1841	An Act to explain and amend Two several Acts relating to the Ecclesiastical Commissioners for England.	Section Three from "and that" to "shall remain in the Patronage of the Archbishop or Bishop of the Diocese for the Time being until a Successor shall be collated thereto;". Section Eight. Section Nine from "Provided always" to end of that Section. Section Twelve from "That" to "repealed; and". Section Fourteen. Section Eighteen to "and that", and from "provided" to end of that Section. Section Twenty-eight. Section Thirty from "and that" to end of that Section. Section Thirty-one.
4 & 5 Vict. c. 41	Houses of Industry, etc. (Ireland) Act 1841	An Act to provide for the Payment of Debts,—Houses of Industry and Workhouses, in certain Cases, in Ireland.	The whole act.
4 & 5 Vict. c. 43	Western Australia Government Act 1841	An Act to continue until the Thirty-first Day of December,— Settlements in Western Australia on the Western Coast of New Holland.	The whole act.
4 & 5 Vict. c. 44	New South Wales, etc. Government Act 1841	An Act to continue until the Thirty-first Day of December,—New South Wales and Van Diemen's Land, and for the more effectual Government thereof.	The whole act.
4 & 5 Vict. c. 45	Sewers Act 1841	An Act to amend an Act passed in the Third and Fourth Years of the Reign of His late Majesty King William the Fourth, intituled An Act to amend the Laws relating to Sewers.	Sections Nine, Sixteen and Seventeen.
4 & 5 Vict. c. 49	County Bridges Act 1841	An Act to provide for repairing, improving, and rebuilding County Bridges.	Section Five.
4 & 5 Vict. c. 50	Bank Notes Act 1841	An Act to make further Provision relative to the Returns to be made by Banks of the Amount of their Notes in Circulation.	The whole act.
4 & 5 Vict. c. 52	Court of Chancery (No. 1) Act 1841	An Act to amend an Act of the Fourth Year of Her present Majesty, intituled An Act for facilitating the Administration of Justice in the Court of Chancery.	The whole act.
4 & 5 Vict. c. 53	Appropriation Act 1841	An Act to apply certain Sums of Money to the Service of the Year One thousand eight hundred and forty-one, and to appropriate the Supplies granted in this Session of Parliament.	The whole act.
4 & 5 Vict. c. 54	Usury Act 1841	An Act to continue until the First Day of January,—exempting certain Bills of Exchange and Promissory Notes from the Operation of the Laws relating to Usury.	The whole act.
4 & 5 Vict. c. 55	Loan Societies Act 1841	An Act further to continue, until the First Day of April One thousand eight hundred and forty-two, an Act of the Third and Fourth Year of the Reign of Her present Majesty, intituled An Act to amend the Laws relating to Loan Societies.	The whole act.
4 & 5 Vict. c. 56	Substitution of Punishments for Death Act 1841	An Act for taking away the Punishment of Death in certain Cases, and substituting other Punishments in lieu thereof.	Except Sections One, Four and Six so far as they relate to offences mentioned in 55 Geo. 3. c. 135. s. 7. and except Section Five to "Britain,".
4 & 5 Vict. c. 58	Controverted Elections Act 1841	An Act to amend the Law for the Trial of controverted Elections.	The whole act.
4 & 5 Vict. c. 59	Application of Highway Rates to Turnpikes Act 1841	An Act to authorize for One Year, and until the End of the then next Session of Parliament, the Application of a Portion of the Highway Rates to Turnpike Roads, in certain Cases.	Section Three from "nor on" to end of that Section. Sections Six and Seven.
4 & 5 Vict. c. 61	Militia Pay Act 1841	An Act to defray the Charge of the Pay,—Militia, until the First Day of July One thousand eight hundred and forty-two.	The whole act.
5 Vict. c. 5	Loan Societies Act 1842	An Act to make further Provisions for the Administration of Justice.	Sections Two and Three. Section Six from "the Sum of One" to "Exchequer; and" (where those words first occur). Section Twenty-one. Section Twenty-five to "Westminster; and that", and from "after the Death" to "respectively,". Sections Thirty-two to Thirty-four. Section Thirty-five to "either of them", from "(but subject and" to "appointed under this Act", from "and the net" to "Chancery;" and from "and (except the Salary" to end of that Section. Section Thirty-seven from "from" to "England" and the words "other than the present Vice-Chancellor." Section Thirty-eight from "and that Edward" to "respectively named;". Section Forty from "and Richard" to "respectively named;". Sections Forty-three to Forty-five. Section Forty-eight, the words "Masters in Ordinary," "the Masters in Ordinary of the said Court of Chancery, and other", and "Masters and other". Section Forty-nine from "(other" to "Ordinary),". Section Fifty-six, the words "after the said Fifteenth Day of October One thousand eight hundred and forty-one", from "to be paid out" to "them, (but subject and without prejudice as aforesaid,)" and from "by the Governor" to "in every Year,". Section Sixty-six. The following names of causes in the Second Schedule; namely, - The King v. Delamotte. Okey. Kent. Whitworth. The Queen v. Lane. Holt. and the sums of cash opposite thereto. The two last names or titles in the Third Schedule and the salaries set opposite thereto. The following Sections from and after the first day of November 1875; namely,-Sections Nineteen, Twenty, Twenty-two, Twenty-three, and Twenty-eight to Thirty-one.
5 Vict. c. 6	Bishops in Foreign Countries Act 1841	An Act to amend an Act made in the Twenty-sixth Year,—Countries out of His Majesty's Dominions.	Section Six.
5 Vict. c. 7	Extended Law Continuance Act 1841	An Act to continue until the Thirty-first Day of July One thousand eight hundred and forty-two, such Laws as may expire within a limited Period.	The whole act.
5 Vict. c. 9	Census Act 1841	An Act to provide for Payment of the Persons employed in taking Account of the Population in England.	The whole act.
5 Vict. c. 10	Poor Law Commission Act 1841	An Act to continue the Poor Law Commission until the Thirty-first Day of July One thousand eight hundred and forty-two.	The whole act.
5 Vict. c. 11	Forged Exchequer Bills Act 1842	An Act for raising the Sum of Ten millions six hundred and twenty-six thousand three hundred and fifty Pounds by Exchequer Bills, for the Service of the Year One thousand eight hundred and forty-one, and for appropriating the Supplies granted in this Session of Parliament.	The whole act.
5 & 6 Vict. c. 1	Appropriation Acts Amendment Act 1842	An Act better to provide for the Application to the Service of the Year One thousand eight hundred and forty-one of the Sums granted in the Two last Sessions of Parliament.	The whole act.
5 & 6 Vict. c. 3	Van Diemen's Land Act 1842	An Act to confirm an Act of the Legislature of Van Diemen's Land for authorizing the Levy of certain Duties of Customs and on Spirits.	Repealed as to all Her Majesty's Dominions.
5 & 6 Vict. c. 4	Bishoprics, etc., in West Indies Act 1842	An Act to provide for the Increase of the Number of Bishoprics and Archdeaconries in the West Indies, and to amend the several Acts relating thereto.	Except Section One. Repealed as to all Her Majesty's Dominions.
5 & 6 Vict. c. 5	Loan Societies Act 1842	An Act to continue to the First Day of August One thousand eight hundred and forty-three the Act to amend the Laws relating to Loan Societies.	The whole act.
5 & 6 Vict. c. 6	Newgate Gaol, Dublin Act 1842	An Act to amend an Act of Her present Majesty for vacating any Presentment for rebuilding the Gaol of Newgate in Dublin, and any Contract between the Commissioners for rebuilding the said Gaol and the Contractor.	The whole act.
5 & 6 Vict. c. 7	Parish Apprentices Act 1842	An Act to explain the Acts for the better Regulation of certain Apprentices.	Section Two.
5 & 6 Vict. c. 8	Supply Act 1842	An Act to apply the sum of Eight Millions out of the Consolidated Fund to the Service of the Year One thousand eight hundred and forty-two.	The whole act.
5 & 6 Vict. c. 9	Advances for Public Works Act 1842	An Act to authorize the Advance of Money out of the Consolidated Fund to a limited amount for carrying on Public Works and Fisheries, and Employment of the Poor; and to amend the Acts authorizing the Issue of Exchequer Bills for the like Purposes.	Sections One to Three, Five to Eight, Ten, Twelve, Thirteen, Twenty-two and Twenty-three.
5 & 6 Vict. c. 11	Forged Exchequer Bills Act 1842	An Act for appointing Commissioners to inquire as to the Issue, Receipt, Circulation, and Possession of certain forged Exchequer Bills.	The whole act.
5 & 6 Vict. c. 12	Mutiny Act 1842	An Act for punishing Mutiny and Desertion, and for the better Payment of the Army and their Quarters.	The whole act.
5 & 6 Vict. c. 13	Marine Mutiny Act 1842	An Act for the Regulation of Her Majesty's Royal Marine Forces while on Shore.	The whole act.
5 & 6 Vict. c. 14	Duties on Corn Act 1842	An Act to amend the Laws for the Importation of Corn.	Sections One to Eight and Nineteen. Section Twenty-two, the words "or any Three or more of them," (wherever they occur). Section Twenty-eight from "by" to "shall be regulated," from "for the" to "said Duties;" and from "and shall on" to end of that Section. Section Thirty. Section Thirty-seven from "or to any" to "Cambridge respectively,". Section Forty-five. The Table of Duties. The Schedule of Cities and Towns so far as it relates to the Counties of Rutland and Hereford, to Shropshire and Staffordshire and to the towns against which an asterisk is placed. Repealed as to all Her Majesty's Dominions.
5 & 6 Vict. c. 15	Duties on Spirits, etc. Act 1842	An Act to impose an additional Duty on Spirits, and to repeal the Allowance on Spirits made from Malt only, in Ireland.	The whole act.
5 & 6 Vict. c. 16	Soap Duties Allowances Act 1842	An Act to continue, until the End of the Session of Parliament next after the Thirty-first Day of July One thousand eight hundred and forty-four certain of the Allowances of the Duty of Excise on Soap used in Manufactures.	The whole act.
5 & 6 Vict. c. 17	Timber Ships, America Act 1842	An Act for preventing, until the First Day of May One thousand eight hundred and forty-five, Ships clearing out from any Port in British North America, or in the Settlement of Honduras, from loading any Part of their Cargo of Timber upon Deck.	Repealed as to all Her Majesty's Dominions.
5 & 6 Vict. c. 21	Exchequer Bills Act 1842	An Act for raising the Sum of Nine millions one hundred thousand Pounds by Exchequer Bills, for the Service of the Year One thousand eight hundred and forty-two.	The whole act.
5 & 6 Vict. c. 22	Queen's Prison Act 1842	An Act for consolidating the Queen's Bench, Fleet, and Marshalsea Prisons, and for regulating the Queen's Prison.	Section One from "and after" to end of that Section. Sections Two to Four and Eight to Fifteen. Section Sixteen to "repealed;". Sections Seventeen to Twenty-eight.
5 & 6 Vict. c. 23	Turnpike Acts (Ireland) Act 1842	An Act to continue until the Thirty-first Day of July One thousand eight hundred and forty-three, and to the End of the then Session of Parliament, the several Acts for regulating Turnpike Roads in Ireland.	The whole act.
5 & 6 Vict. c. 24	Dublin Police Act 1842	An Act for improving the Dublin Police.	Section Two so far as it relates to turnpike roads. Sections Forty-one to Forty-four. Section Seventy-five from "or unless" to "Dublin;". Sections Seventy-six, Seventy-seven and Eighty.
5 & 6 Vict. c. 25	Duties on Spirit Mixtures, etc. Act 1842	An Act to repeal the present and impose,—Allowance on Spirits made from Malt only in Ireland.	The whole act.
5 & 6 Vict. c. 26	Ecclesiastical Houses of Residence Act 1842	An Act to alter and amend the Law relating to Ecclesiastical Houses of Residence.	Sections Three and Fifteen.
5 & 6 Vict. c. 27	Ecclesiastical Leases Act 1842	An Act for better enabling Incumbents of Ecclesiastical Benefices to demise the Lands belonging to their Benefices on Farming Leases.	Section Seventeen.
5 & 6 Vict. c. 28	Capital Punishment (Ireland) Act 1842	An Act to assimilate the Law in Ireland, as to the Punishment of Death, to the Law in England; to abolish the Punishment of Death in certain Cases in Ireland, and to substitute other Punishments in lieu thereof.	Sections Three, Twenty-two and Twenty-three.
5 & 6 Vict. c. 29	Pentonville Prison Act 1842	An Act for establishing a Prison at Pentonville.	Section Three from "and that" to end of that Section. Sections Four, Five, Eleven, Twenty-three and Thirty-two.
5 & 6 Vict. c. 30	Roasted Malt for Colouring Beer Act 1842	An Act to provide Regulations for preparing and using Roasted Malt in colouring Beer.	Section One, the words "from and after the Commencement of this Act". Section Two to "forty-two". Section Nineteen.
5 & 6 Vict. c. 31	Harwich, etc., Election Act 1842	An Act to indemnify Witnesses who may give Evidence before the Committee appointed by the House of Commons,—whether such Bribery has really taken place.	The whole act.
5 & 6 Vict. c. 32	Fines and Recoveries Act 1842	An Act for better recording Fines and Recoveries in Wales and Cheshire.	Section Two from "Provided always" to end of that Section. Section Three from "Provided also" to end of that Section. Section Six.
5 & 6 Vict. c. 34	Sugar Duties Act 1842	An Act for granting to Her Majesty, until the Fifth Day of July One thousand eight hundred and forty-three, certain Duties on Sugar imported into the United Kingdom, for the Service of the Year One thousand eight hundred and forty-two.	The whole act.
5 & 6 Vict. c. 35	Income Tax Act 1842	An Act for granting to Her Majesty Duties on Profits arising from Property, Professions, Trades, and Offices, until the Sixth Day of April One thousand eight hundred and forty-five.	Sections One and Two. Section Three to "and that". Section Five from "the Directors" to "South Sea Company,". Sections Twenty-five and Twenty-six. Section Thirty-five from "and from serving" to "dwell". Section Thirty-nine, the words "Ireland, or" (wherever they occur). Section Fifty-four from "Provided also" to end of that Section. Section Eighty-eight, Schedule (C.), Rules from "and to" to "resident in Ireland,". Section Eighty-nine so far as it relates to the South Sea Company. Sections Ninety to Ninety-two. Section Ninety-four from "the Bank of Ireland" to "respectively,". Section One hundred, Schedule (D.), Fourth Case and Fifth Case respectively, the words "in Ireland, or". Section One hundred and two, the words "in Ireland, or". Section One hundred and six from "Provided always, that the" to end of that Section. Sections One hundred and seven, One hundred and forty-three to One hundred and forty-five and One hundred and forty-eight. Section One hundred and seventy-two from "by quarterly" to "directed,". Section One hundred and seventy-five. Section One hundred and seventy-six from "and the said" to end of that Section. Section One hundred and seventy-nine, the words "Contract of Composition,". Section One hundred and eighty-three from "and for the careful" to "otherwise;" and from "Provided also" to end of that Section. Section One hundred and eighty-six to "Commissioners of Stamps and Taxes:" and from "out" to "Duties". Section One hundred and ninety-three and One hundred and ninety-four.
5 & 6 Vict. c. 37	Land Tax Act 1842	An Act to continue until the Fifth Day of April One thousand eight hundred and forty-four Compositions for Assessed Taxes; and to amend the Laws relating to the Land and Assessed Taxes.	Sections One and Two.
5 & 6 Vict. c. 38	Quarter Sessions Act 1842	An Act to define the Jurisdiction of Justices in General and Quarter Sessions of the Peace.	Section One, the item of offences numbered 13, and from "Provided" to end of that Section. Section Five.
5 & 6 Vict. c. 39	Factors Act 1842	An Act to amend the Law relating to Advances bona fide made to Agents intrusted with Goods.	Section Nine.
5 & 6 Vict. c. 43	Confirmation of Certain Proceedings Act 1842	An Act to confirm certain Proceedings which may have been had after the passing of the Act intituled An Act to define the Jurisdiction of Justices in General and Quarter Sessions of the Peace.	The whole act.
5 & 6 Vict. c. 44	Licensing Act 1842	An Act for the Transfer of Licences and Regulation of Public Houses.	Section Four.
5 & 6 Vict. c. 45	Copyright Act 1842	An Act to amend the Law of Copyright.	Sections One and Thirty.
5 & 6 Vict. c. 46	Justices (Ireland) Act 1842	An Act to amend an Act of the Third and Fourth Years of Her present Majesty, for the Regulation of Municipal Corporations in Ireland.	Sections One, Two and Six.
5 & 6 Vict. c. 50	Poor Rates Act 1842	An Act to continue, until the First Day of October One thousand eight hundred and forty-three, the Exemption of Inhabitants of Parishes, Townships, and Villages from Liability to be rated as such, in respect of Stock in Trade or other Property, to the Relief of the Poor.	The whole act.
5 & 6 Vict. c. 52	Sudbury Disfranchisement Act 1842	An Act to indemnify Witnesses who may give Evidence before the Lords Spiritual and Temporal on a Bill to exclude the Borough of Sudbury from sending Burgesses to serve in Parliament.	The whole act.
5 & 6 Vict. c. 54	Tithe Act 1842	An Act to amend the Acts for the Commutation of Tithes in England and Wales, and to continue the Officers appointed under the said Acts for a Time to be limited.	Section One. Section Fifteen from "the Registrar" to "and after the passing of this Act". Section Twenty-one.
5 & 6 Vict. c. 55	Railway Regulation Act 1842	An Act for the better Regulation of Railways, and for the Conveyance of Troops.	Sections One, Three and Twenty-three.
5 & 6 Vict. c. 57	Poor Law Amendment Act 1842	An Act to continue until the Thirty-first Day of July One thousand eight hundred and forty-seven, and to the End of the then next Session of Parliament, the Poor Law Commission; and for the further Amendment of the Laws relating to the Poor in England.	Sections One, Three and Six. Section Eighteen from "and so" to "Number in Ireland", from "or the" to "last recited", from "(except the said" to "Poor in Ireland)", and from "or by" to end of that Section. Section Nineteen to "Removal,". Section Twenty. The Schedule.
5 & 6 Vict. c. 58	Ecclesiastical Jurisdiction Act 1842	An Act for further suspending, until the First Day of October One thousand eight hundred and forty-three, the Operation of the new Arrangement of Dioceses, so far as it affects the existing Ecclesiastical Jurisdictions.	The whole act.
5 & 6 Vict. c. 60	Turnpike Acts Continuance Act 1842	An Act to continue until the First Day of October One thousand eight hundred and forty-three certain Turnpike Acts.	The whole act.
5 & 6 Vict. c. 63	Fisheries, Convention with France Act 1842	An Act to continue until the First Day of August One thousand eight hundred and forty-three an Act for carrying into effect a Convention between Her Majesty and the King of the French relative to the Fisheries on the Coasts of the British Islands and of France.	The whole act.
5 & 6 Vict. c. 68	Textile Manufactures (Ireland) Act 1842	An Act to amend, and continue,—Linen, Hempen, Union, Cotton, Silk, and Woollen Manufactures in Ireland, and for the better Payment of their Wages.	Section One. Section Four from "so much" to "thereof". Section Seven.
5 & 6 Vict. c. 70	Chelsea Hospital Out-pensioners Act 1842	An Act to amend the Laws relating to the Payment of Out-Pensioners of Chelsea Hospital.	The whole act.
5 & 6 Vict. c. 72	Militia Ballots Suspension Act 1842	An Act to suspend until the Thirty-first Day of August One thousand eight hundred and forty-three the making of Lists and the Ballots and Enrolments for the Militia of the United Kingdom.	The whole act.
5 & 6 Vict. c. 73	Controverted Elections Act 1842	An Act to continue until the Thirty-first Day of July One thousand eight hundred and forty-three, and to the End of the then Session of Parliament, an Act for amending the Law for the trial of controverted Elections.	The whole act.
5 & 6 Vict. c. 74	University of Dublin Registration Act 1842	An Act to amend an Act of the Second and Third Years of His late Majesty, to amend the Representation of the People of Ireland, in respect of the Right of Voting in the University of Dublin.	Sections One to Three and Eight.
5 & 6 Vict. c. 77	Grand Jury Presentments (Ireland) Act 1842	An Act to enable Grand Juries at the ensuing Summer and Spring Assizes,—Places recently annexed to Counties at large in Ireland.	The whole act.
5 & 6 Vict. c. 79	Railway Passenger Duty Act 1842	An Act to repeal the Duties payable on Stage Carriages and on Passengers conveyed upon Railways, and certain other Stamp Duties in Great Britain, and to grant other duties in lieu thereof; and also to amend the Laws relating to the Stamp Duties.	Section One. Section Two from "for and in respect of every Licence" to "Carriage, and", from "and also" to "printed," and from "and that all" to end of that Section. Section Four from "and every such" to "rendered as aforesaid;". Section Seven, the words "of Insolvent,". Sections Twenty, Twenty-six and Twenty-seven.
5 & 6 Vict. c. 80	Income Tax (Foreign Dividends) Act 1842	An Act to grant relief from the Duties of Assessed Taxes in certain Cases, and to provide for the assessing and charging the Property Tax on Dividends payable out of the Revenue of Foreign States.	Sections One and Three.
5 & 6 Vict. c. 81	Game Certificates (Ireland) Act 1842	An Act to transfer the Collection and Management of the Duties on Certificates to kill Game in Ireland to the Commissioners of Excise.	Sections Four, Six and Nine to Eleven.
5 & 6 Vict. c. 82	Stamp Duties (Ireland) Act 1842	An Act to assimilate the Stamp Duties in Great Britain and Ireland, and to make Regulations for collecting and managing the same, until the Tenth Day of October One thousand eight hundred and forty-five.	Sections Forty-two to Forty-four.
5 & 6 Vict. c. 84	Lunacy Act 1842	An Act to alter and amend the Practice and Course of Proceeding under Commissions in the Nature of Writs De lunatico inquirendo.	The whole act.
5 & 6 Vict. c. 85	Joint Stock Banking Companies Act 1842	An Act to amend the Law relative to legal Proceedings by certain Joint Stock Banking Companies against their own Members, and by such Members against the Companies.	The whole act.
5 & 6 Vict. c. 86	Exchequer Court Act 1842	An Act for abolishing certain Offices on the Revenue Side of the Court of Exchequer in England, and for regulating the Office of Her Majesty's Remembrancer in that Court.	Sections One, Three, Six and Eleven.
5 & 6 Vict. c. 88	Western Australia Government Act 1842	An Act to continue,—Settlements in Western Australia on the Western Coast of New Holland.	Repealed as to all Her Majesty's Dominions.
5 & 6 Vict. c. 89	Drainage (Ireland) Act 1842	An Act to promote the Drainage of Lands, and Improvement of Navigation and Water Power in connexion with such Drainage, in Ireland.	Section Fifty-two so far as it relates to the Court of Exchequer. Section One hundred and thirty-eight from "and such Penalties" to end of that Section. Sections One hundred and forty-two and One hundred and sixty-two.
5 & 6 Vict. c. 90	Militia Pay Act 1842	An Act to defray the Charge of the Pay,—Militia, until the First Day of July One thousand eight hundred and forty-three.	The whole act.
5 & 6 Vict. c. 92	Bonded Corn Act 1842	An Act to permit, until the Thirty-first Day of August One thousand eight hundred and forty-five, Wheat to be delivered from the Warehouse or the Vessel Duty-free, upon the previous substitution of an equivalent Quantity of Flour or Biscuit in the Warehouse.	The whole act.
5 & 6 Vict. c. 93	Tobacco Act 1842	An Act to amend an Act of the Fourth Year of Her present Majesty, to discontinue the Excise Survey on Tobacco, and to provide other Regulations in lieu thereof.	Sections Nine, Eleven, Twelve, Fifteen and Sixteen.
5 & 6 Vict. c. 94	Defence Act 1842	An Act to consolidate and amend the Laws relating to the Services of the Ordnance Department, and the vesting and Purchase of Lands and Hereditaments for those Services, and for the Defence and Security of the Realm.	Sections One to Four. Section Seven to "and that". Section Nine from "and all" to end of that Section. Sections Eleven, Thirty-five and Thirty-eight.
5 & 6 Vict. c. 95	Four Courts Marshalsea (Ireland) Act 1842	An Act for consolidating the Four Courts Marshalsea, Dublin, Sheriff's Prison, Dublin, and City Marshalsea, Dublin, and for regulating the Four Courts Marshalsea in Ireland.	Except Section One to "contained:" and Section Nine.
5 & 6 Vict. c. 97	Limitations of Actions and Costs Act 1842	An Act to amend the Law relating to Double Costs, Notices of Action, Limitations of Actions, and Pleas of the General Issue, under certain Acts of Parliament.	Section Six.
5 & 6 Vict. c. 98	Prisons Act 1842	An Act to amend the Laws concerning Prisons.	Sections Seven, Nine, Eleven, Fourteen and Seventeen. Section Eighteen, the words "heretofore incurred, or hereafter to be", and from "Provided" to end of that Section. Sections Nineteen and Twenty, the words "heretofore incurred or hereafter to be". Section Thirty-four.
5 & 6 Vict. c. 100	Copyright of Designs Act 1842	An Act to consolidate and amend the Laws relating to the Copyright of Designs for ornamenting Articles of Manufacture.	Sections One and Two. Section Three from "provided" to "Ireland,". Section Eleven from "and unless" to "Ireland,". Section Fourteen to "Clerks, Officers, and Servants; and," and the words "and such Registrar shall have a Seal of Office." Section Twenty-one. Schedules (A.) and (B.).
5 & 6 Vict. c. 103	Court of Chancery Act 1842	An Act for abolishing certain Offices of the High Court of Chancery in England.	Sections One and Two. Section Three to "Clerk; and from and after the said Twenty-eighth Day of October", and the subsequent words "from and after the said Twenty-eighth Day of October" (wherever they occur). Section Four from "That" to "Act; and". Section Seven from "and also" to "Chancery,". Section Eight, the words "or Clerk of Affidavits,". Section Nine from "and every such Clerk shall be entitled under this Act to a" to "Annum:". Section Ten. Section Eleven to "of this Act" and the words "that from and after the said Twenty-eighth Day of October". Sections Twelve and Thirteen. Section Fourteen from "or which" to "of compensation," and the subsequent words "the said Twenty-eighth Day of October next after the passing of this Act, or" and "(whichever shall last happen,)". Sections Fifteen to Seventeen. Section Twenty-eight from "and shall" to "Manner,". Section Twenty-nine. Section Thirty from "at" to "fit,". Sections Thirty-three, Thirty-five and Thirty-eight.
5 & 6 Vict. c. 104	Municipal Corporations (Ireland) Act 1842	An Act to explain and amend certain Enactments contained respectively in the Acts for the Regulation of Municipal Corporations in England and Wales and in Ireland.	Sections Three to Six. Section Seven, the words "and to have been" and from "(unless" to "Act),". Section Nine.
5 & 6 Vict. c. 105	Reclamation of Lands, etc. (Ireland) Act 1842	An Act to amend an Act of the First and Second Years of His late Majesty King William the Fourth, to empower Landed Proprietors in Ireland to sink, embank, and remove Obstructions in Rivers.	Section Eight from "Provided" to end of that Section. Section Thirteen.
5 & 6 Vict. c. 106	Fisheries (Ireland) Act 1842	An Act to regulate the Irish Fisheries.	Section One to "been passed:" and from "Provided also, that nothing herein contained shall repeal" to end of that Section. Sections One hundred and four and One hundred and nine. Section One hundred and ten from "and the Defendant" to "Authority of this Act;". Section One hundred and fifteen.
5 & 6 Vict. c. 108	Ecclesiastical Leasing Act 1842	An Act for enabling Ecclesiastical Corporations, aggregate and sole, to grant Leases for long Terms of Years.	Section Thirty-two from "and to" to "Man,". Section Thirty-three.
5 & 6 Vict. c. 109	Parish Constables Act 1842	An Act for the Appointment and Payment of Parish Constables.	Section One from "after the Expiration" to "Act, and", and the word "following". Section Two, the words "within Thirty Days next after the passing of this Act, and", the word "following" (wherever it occurs) and from "within Eighty" to "Act and". Section Eight, the words "on the Three Sundays next before the Day limited for making their Return in this Year, and" from "during" to "Year, and", and the word "following" (wherever it occurs). Section Eleven, the words "of such Number", from "as they" to "of the Parish)" and the words "as herein-after provided,". Section Fourteen, the words "and swearing". Section Fifteen from "Provided" to end of that Section. Section Sixteen from "and in the" to end of that Section. Sections Eighteen to Twenty and Twenty-seven.
5 & 6 Vict. c. 111	Borough Charters Confirmation Act 1842	An Act to confirm the Incorporation of certain Boroughs, and to indemnify such Persons as have sustained Loss thereby.	The whole act.
5 & 6 Vict. c. 112	Sees of St. Asaph and Bangor Act 1842	An Act for suspending, until the First Day of October One thousand eight hundred and forty-three, Appointments to certain Ecclesiastical Preferments in the Dioceses of Saint Asaph and Bangor, and for securing certain Property to the said Sees.	The whole act.
5 & 6 Vict. c. 113	Marriages Confirmation (Ireland) Act 1842	An Act for Confirmation of certain Marriages in Ireland.	Sections Three and Four.
5 & 6 Vict. c. 115	Exchequer Bills Act 1842	An Act for raising the Sum of Nine millions one hundred and ninety-three thousand Pounds by Exchequer Bills, for the Service of the Year One thousand eight hundred and forty-two.	The whole act.
5 & 6 Vict. c. 117	Manchester, etc., Police Act 1842	An Act to amend and continue until the First Day of October One thousand eight hundred and forty-two the Acts regulating the Police of Manchester, Birmingham, and Bolton.	The whole act.
5 & 6 Vict. c. 118	Canada Loan Guarantee Act 1842	An Act for guaranteeing the Payment of the Interest on a Loan of One million five hundred thousand Pounds to be raised by the Province of Canada.	The whole act.
5 & 6 Vict. c. 120	Newfoundland Act 1842	An Act for amending the Constitution of the Government of Newfoundland.	Sections Five, Six, and Eight to Eleven. Repealed as to all Her Majesty's Dominions.
5 & 6 Vict. c. 121	Appropriation Act 1842	An Act to apply a Sum out of the Consolidated Fund, and certain other Sums, to the Service of the Year One thousand eight hundred and forty-two, and to appropriate the Supplies granted in this Session of Parliament.	The whole act.
5 & 6 Vict. c. 123	Private Lunatic Asylums (Ireland) Act 1842	An Act for amending until the First Day of August One thousand eight hundred and forty-five, and until the End of the then next Session of Parliament, the Law relating to Private Lunatic Asylums in Ireland.	Section Forty-eight from "and shall" to "Authority of this Act;" and from "or that" to "County,". Sections Fifty-one and Fifty-three.
6 & 7 Vict. c. 1	Forged Exchequer Bills Act 1843	An Act to enable Her Majesty to indemnify the Holders of certain forged Exchequer Bills.	The whole act.
6 & 7 Vict. c. 2	Coal Vendors Act 1843	An Act to discontinue certain Actions under the Provisions of an Act of the Second Year of King William the Fourth, for regulating the Vend and Delivery of Coals in the Cities of London and Westminster, and in certain Parts of the adjacent Counties.	The whole act.
6 & 7 Vict. c. 3	Mutiny Act 1843	An Act for punishing Mutiny and Desertion, and for the better Payment of the Army and their Quarters.	The whole act.
6 & 7 Vict. c. 4	Marine Mutiny Act 1843	An Act for the Regulation of Her Majesty's Royal Marine Forces while on shore.	The whole act.
6 & 7 Vict. c. 5	Supply Act 1843	An Act to apply the Sum of Eight Millions out of the Consolidated Fund to the Service of the Year One thousand eight hundred and forty-three.	The whole act.
6 & 7 Vict. c. 7	Transportation Act 1843	An Act to amend the Law affecting transported Convicts with respect to Pardons and Tickets of Leave.	Sections One and Six.
6 & 7 Vict. c. 8	Justices (Ireland) Act 1843	An Act to empower Justices of the Peace in Ireland to act in certain Cases relating to Rates to which they are chargeable.	Sections Two and Three.
6 & 7 Vict. c. 11	Sudbury Disfranchisement Act 1843	An Act to indemnify Witnesses who may give Evidence before the Lords Spiritual and Temporal on a Bill to exclude the Borough of Sudbury from sending Burgesses to serve in Parliament.	The whole act.
6 & 7 Vict. c. 12	Coroners Act 1843	An Act for the more convenient holding of Coroners Inquests.	Section Five.
6 & 7 Vict. c. 13	British Settlements Act 1843	An Act to enable Her Majesty to provide for the Government of Her Settlements on the Coast of Africa and in the Falkland Islands.	Section Three.
6 & 7 Vict. c. 17	Exchequer Bills Act 1843	An Act for raising the Sum of Nine Millions and Fifty thousand Pounds by Exchequer Bills, for the Service of the Year One thousand eight hundred and forty-three.	The whole act.
6 & 7 Vict. c. 18	Parliamentary Voters Registration Act 1843	An Act to amend the Law for the Registration of Persons entitled to vote, and to define certain Rights of voting, and to regulate certain Proceedings in the Election of Members to serve in Parliament for England and Wales.	Section One. Section Two from "come" to "thenceforth". Section Fourteen, the words "in the present and" and "succeeding". Section Twenty-eight from "of less" to "standing, or". Section Forty-nine to "forty-three; and". Section Fifty-nine from "and all" to "Ireland:" and from "and every such Sum" to "Fund,". Sections Sixty-one, Seventy-two, and One hundred and two. Schedule (A.) Form No. 1.
6 & 7 Vict. c. 20	Court of Queen's Bench Act 1843	An Act for abolishing certain Offices on the Crown Side of the Court of Queen's Bench, and for regulating the Crown Office.	Section One from "from and" to "forty-four", from "and from" to end of that Section and so far as the rest of that Section relates to One Assistant Master. Section Two to "Behaviour; and", and from "Provided" to end of that Section. Section Three, the word "Three" (wherever it occurs), from "or any Person" to "abolished :", the word "absolutely" and from "and no" to end of that Section. Section Six so far as it relates to the Assistant Master. Section Seven from "and the said" to "forty-four, and". Section Eight. Section Nine from "Provided" to end of that Section. Section Ten. Section Thirteen to "and the said Officers, and", from "where" to "said Act, and", and from "and all Officers" to end of that Section. Section Fifteen so far as it relates to the Assistant Master. Section Seventeen, the words "from and after the said First Day of January One thousand eight hundred and forty-four" (wherever they occur) and" and Assistant Master,". Sections Eighteen and Nineteen.
6 & 7 Vict. c. 21	Turnpike Acts (Ireland) Act 1843	An Act to continue until the Thirty-first Day of July One thousand eight hundred and forty-four, and to the End of the then Session of Parliament, the several Acts for regulating Turnpike Roads in Ireland.	The whole act.
6 & 7 Vict. c. 22	(Colonies) Evidence Act 1843	An Act to authorize the Legislatures of certain of Her Majesty's Colonies to pass Laws for the Admission, in certain Cases, of unsworn Testimony in Civil and Criminal Proceedings.	Section Two.
6 & 7 Vict. c. 24	Land Tax, Assessed Tax, and Income Tax Act 1843	An Act to continue until the Fifth Day of April,—Duties on Profits arising from Property, Professions, Trades, and Offices.	Sections One to Three and Nine.
6 & 7 Vict. c. 26	Millbank Prison Act 1843	An Act for regulating the Prison at Millbank.	Sections One and Thirty.
6 & 7 Vict. c. 27	Sugar Duties Act 1843	An Act for granting to Her Majesty, until the Fifth Day of July One thousand eight hundred and forty-four, certain Duties on Sugar imported into the United Kingdom, for the Service of the Year One thousand eight hundred and forty-three.	The whole act.
6 & 7 Vict. c. 30	Pound-breach Act 1843	An Act to amend the Law relating to Pound-breach and Rescue in certain Cases.	Section Two, the words "or Insolvency,".
6 & 7 Vict. c. 32	Grand Juries (Ireland) Act 1843	An Act to amend the Laws in force relating to Grand Jury Presentments in Counties of Cities and Towns in Ireland.	Section One from "and that all" to "quashed:". Sections Two and Three. Section Four from "or any Sums" to "issuable,". Sections Sixteen to Eighteen and Twenty-seven.
6 & 7 Vict. c. 34	Apprehension of Offenders Act 1843	An Act for the better Apprehension of certain Offenders.	Section Ten from "such as" to "Sessions of the Peace,". Section Eleven. Repealed as to all Her Majesty's Dominions.
6 & 7 Vict. c. 35	Norfolk Island Act 1843	An Act to amend so much of an Act of the last Session, for the Government of New South Wales and Van Diemen's Land, as relates to Norfolk Island.	The whole act.
6 & 7 Vict. c. 37	New Parishes Act 1843	An Act to make better Provision for the Spiritual Care of populous Parishes.	Section Twenty-seven.
6 & 7 Vict. c. 38	Judicial Committee Act 1843	An Act to make further Regulations for facilitating the hearing Appeals and other Matters by the Judicial Committee of the Privy Council.	Sections Four, Six and Eight. Section Eleven from "and from" to "Westward thereof," and from "and all Causes" to "appealed from,". Section Sixteen.
6 & 7 Vict. c. 39	Marriages Confirmation (Ireland) Act 1843	An Act for Confirmation of certain Marriages in Ireland.	Section Two.
6 & 7 Vict. c. 40	Hosiery Act 1843	An Act to amend the Laws for the Prevention of Frauds and Abuses,—Wages of the Workmen engaged therein.	Section Twenty-four, the words "the Informer or Prosecutor, or". Sections Thirty-two, Thirty-six and Thirty-seven.
6 & 7 Vict. c. 41	Loan Societies Act 1843	An Act to continue to the First Day of August One thousand eight hundred and forty-four, and to the End of the then Session of Parliament, the Act to amend the Laws relating to Loan Societies.	The whole act.
6 & 7 Vict. c. 42	Bridges (Ireland) Act 1843	An Act to amend an Act of the Nineteenth and Twentieth Years of King George the Third, for empowering Grand Juries in Ireland to present Bridges, and Tolls to be paid for passing the same, in certain Cases.	Section Three.
6 & 7 Vict. c. 43	Militia Ballots Suspension Act 1843	An Act to suspend until the Thirty-first Day of August One thousand eight hundred and forty-four the making of Lists and the Ballots and Enrolments for the Militia of the United Kingdom.	The whole act.
6 & 7 Vict. c. 44	Public Works (Ireland) Act 1843	An Act to amend the Acts for carrying on Public Works in Ireland.	Except Sections Fourteen and Fifteen.
6 & 7 Vict. c. 45	Usury Act 1843	An Act to continue, until the First Day of January One thousand eight hundred and forty-six, an Act for exempting certain Bills of Exchange and Promissory Notes from the Operation of the Laws relating to Usury.	The whole act.
6 & 7 Vict. c. 47	Controverted Elections Act 1843	An Act to continue until the First Day of August One thousand eight hundred and forty-four, and to the End of the then Session of Parliament, an Act for amending the Law for the Trial of controverted Elections.	The whole act.
6 & 7 Vict. c. 48	Poor Rates Act 1843	An Act to continue, until the First Day of October One thousand eight hundred and forty-four, the Exemption of Inhabitants of Parishes, Townships, and Villages from Liability to be rated as such, in respect of Stock in Trade or other Property, to the Relief of the Poor.	The whole act.
6 & 7 Vict. c. 49	Duties on Spirits Act 1843	An Act to reduce the Duty on Spirits in Ireland, and to impose other countervailing Duties and Drawbacks on the Removal of certain Mixtures and Compounds between Ireland, England, and Scotland respectively.	The whole act.
6 & 7 Vict. c. 54	Limitation of Actions Act 1843	An Act for extending to Ireland the Provisions not already in force there of an Act of the Third and Fourth Years,—and to explain and amend the said Act.	Section Five.
6 & 7 Vict. c. 55	Exchequer Court (Ireland) Act 1843	An Act for the Amendment of the Proceedings and Practice of the Equity Side of the Court of Exchequer in Ireland.	The whole act.
6 & 7 Vict. c. 59	Highway Rates Act 1843	An Act to continue until the First Day of August One thousand eight hundred and forty-four, and, if Parliament be then sitting, to the End of the then next Session of Parliament, an Act for authorizing the Application of Highway Rates to Turnpike Roads.	The whole act.
6 & 7 Vict. c. 60	Ecclesiastical Jurisdiction Act 1843	An Act for suspending until the First Day of October One thousand eight hundred and forty-four the Operation of the new Arrangement of Dioceses, so far as it affects the existing Ecclesiastical Jurisdictions.	The whole act.
6 & 7 Vict. c. 63	West Indies Relief Act 1843	An Act for granting Relief to the Islands of Antigua, Saint Kitts, Nevis, Dominica, and Montserrat.	Repealed as to all Her Majesty's Dominions.
6 & 7 Vict. c. 65	Copyright of Designs Act 1843	An Act to amend the Laws relating to the Copyright of Designs.	Section One. Section Two so far as it relates to 38 Geo. 3. c. 71. Section Seven to "repealed; and". Section Twelve.
6 & 7 Vict. c. 68	Theatres Act 1843	An Act for regulating Theatres.	Section One. Section Two to "as aforesaid,". Sections Eighteen and Twenty-five.
6 & 7 Vict. c. 69	Turnpike Acts 1843	An Act to continue until the First Day of August One thousand eight hundred and forty-four, and to the End of the then next Session of Parliament, certain Turnpike Acts.	The whole act.
6 & 7 Vict. c. 70	Militia Pay Act 1843	An Act to defray, until the First Day of August One thousand eight hundred and forty-four, the Charge of the Pay,—Militia; and to authorize the Employment of the Non-commissioned Officers.	The whole act.
6 & 7 Vict. c. 71	Grand Jury Presentments (Ireland) Act 1843	An Act to make further Provision in respect of Grand Jury Presentments in Counties of Cities and Counties of Towns in Ireland.	The whole act.
6 & 7 Vict. c. 73	Solicitors Act 1843	An Act for consolidating and amending several of the Laws relating to Attornies and Solicitors practising in England and Wales.	Section One to "always,". Section Two from "or in the Court for" to "Debtors,". Section Three from "on" to end of that Section. Section Five from "or take" to "Debtors,". Sections Fifteen and Seventeen so far as they relate to the oath of allegiance. Section Twenty-two to "next" and from "and the" to end of that Section. Section Twenty-three from "in the Form" to end of that Section. Sections Twenty-five, Thirty-four to Thirty-six, Forty-four, Forty-five and Forty-nine. The First Schedule, The First Part. The First Schedule, The Second Part so far as it relates to the following Acts; namely,— 3 Edw. 1. c. 33. 3 Edw. 1. c. 42. 12 Edw. 2. c. 1. 15 Edw. 2. c. 1. 1 Hen. 5. c. 4. 15 Hen. 6. c. 7. 12 Geo. 2. c. 13. 22 Geo. 2. c. 46. 23 Geo. 2. c. 26. 25 Geo. 3. c. 80. 30 Geo. 2. c. 19 (inaccurately quoted as 30 Geo. 3. c. 19.) 34 Geo. 3. c. 14. 37 Geo. 3. c. 90. 44 Geo. 3. c. 59. 49 Geo. 3. c. 28. 54 Geo. 3. c. 144. 6 Geo. 4. c. 16. 7 & 8 Geo. 4. c. 29. 1 & 2 Will. 4. c. 56. 5 & 6 Will. 4. c. 1. 6 & 7 Will. 4. c. 7. 3 & 4 Vict. c. 16. 7 Will 4. c. 12. 1 Vict. c. 16. 3 Vict. c. 16. 4 Vict. c. 11. 5 Vict. Sess. 2. c. 10. 6 Vict. c. 9.
6 & 7 Vict. c. 74	Arms, etc. (Ireland) Act 1843	An Act to amend, and continue for Two Years, and to the End of the then next Session of Parliament, the Laws in Ireland relative to the registering of Arms, and the Importation, Manufacture, and Sale of Arms, Gunpowder, and Ammunition.	The whole act.
6 & 7 Vict. c. 77	Welsh Cathedrals Act 1843	An Act for regulating the Cathedral Churches of Wales.	Section Five to "repealed; and that". Section Eight to "Bishop of Bangor, and", and from "provided" to end of that Section. Sections Nine and Ten. Section Thirteen from "That" to "repealed; and". Sections Fifteen and Sixteen.
6 & 7 Vict. c. 78	Exchequer Court (Ireland) (No. 2) Act 1843	An Act for the further Regulation of the Offices of Chief and Second Remembrancer of the Court of Exchequer in Ireland.	The whole act.
6 & 7 Vict. c. 80	British Subjects in China Act 1843	An Act for the better Government of Her Majesty's Subjects resorting to China.	Sections Two, Five and Seven. Repealed as to all Her Majesty's Dominions.
6 & 7 Vict. c. 83	Coroners (No. 2) Act 1843	An Act to amend the Law respecting the Duties of Coroners.	Section Four.
6 & 7 Vict. c. 85	Evidence Act 1843	An Act for improving the Law of Evidence.	Section One from "Provided that this" to "respectively;". Section Three.
6 & 7 Vict. c. 86	London Hackney Carriages Act 1843	An Act for regulating Hackney and Stage Carriages in and near London.	Section One. Section Two from "and the Word "Waterman"" to "for Passengers;". Section Three, the words "and to Watermen" (wherever they occur), from "and except" to "Commissioners," and from "Provided" to end of that Section. Sections Five and Six. Section Seven from "together" to "to such Carriage;". Section Eight from "and shall" to "suspended;" and so far as the rest of that Section relates to a waterman. Section Nine. Section Ten from "or for" to "a Waterman", the words "or Waterman", and from "and every licensed" to "his Licence,". Sections Eleven to Thirteen. Section Fifteen from "and after" to end of that Section and so far as the rest of that Section relates to a waterman. Section Seventeen so far as it relates to a waterman. Section Twenty, the words "or for any waterman,". Section Twenty-five so far as it relates to a waterman. Section Twenty-seven, the words "or as Waterman,". Section Twenty-eight so far as it relates to a waterman. Section Twenty-nine from "to appoint" to "Standing, and also", and from "every" to "also". Section Thirty-four. Section Thirty-six, the words "or to Watermen,". Section Forty-one so far as it relates to a waterman. Section Forty-eight.
6 & 7 Vict. c. 87	Supply (No. 2) Act 1843	An Act for raising the Sum,—Relief to certain Islands in the West Indies.	The whole act.
6 & 7 Vict. c. 89	Municipal Corporations (England) Act 1843	An Act to amend the Act for the Regulation of Municipal Corporations in England and Wales.	Section One from "which has" to "take place", from "heretofore made" to "made," and the words "or have been". Sections Two to Four. Section Six to "and that". Section Seven.
6 & 7 Vict. c. 90	Public Notaries Act 1843	An Act for removing Doubts as to the Service of Clerks or Apprentices to Public Notaries, and for amending the Laws regulating the Admission of Public Notaries.	Section Seven, the words "in addition to the Oaths of Allegiance and Supremacy," and from "And that" to end of that Section.
6 & 7 Vict. c. 91	Charitable Loan Societies (Ireland) Act 1843	An Act to consolidate and amend the Laws for the Regulation of Charitable Loan Societies in Ireland.	Sections One and Twenty-nine. Section Fifty-five from "and every such" to end of that Section. Section Fifty-eight to "Proceeding; and", and from "and in any" to end of that Section. Section Sixty-three.
6 & 7 Vict. c. 92	Poor Relief (Ireland) Act 1843	An Act for the further Amendment of an Act for the more effectual Relief of the destitute Poor in Ireland.	Section Seven. Section Nine to "and that". Section Ten from "That the Provisions" to "repealed; and". Sections Twenty-seven and Twenty-nine.
6 & 7 Vict. c. 93	Municipal Corporations (Ireland) Act 1843	An Act to amend an Act of the Third and Fourth Years of Her present Majesty for the Regulation of Municipal Corporations in Ireland.	Sections One, Ten to Twelve, Sixteen, Twenty-one and Thirty-two.
6 & 7 Vict. c. 94	Foreign Jurisdiction Act 1843	An Act to remove Doubts as to the Exercise of Power and Jurisdiction by Her Majesty within divers Countries and Places out of Her Majesty's Dominions, and to render the same more effectual.	Sections Eight and Nine.
6 & 7 Vict. c. 96	Libel Act 1843	An Act to amend the Law respecting defamatory Words and Libel.	Section Ten to "and that".
6 & 7 Vict. c. 97	Sudbury Bribery Commission Act 1843	An Act for appointing Commissioners to inquire into the Existence of Bribery in the Borough of Sudbury.	The whole act.
6 & 7 Vict. c. 98	Slave Trade Act 1843	An Act for the more effectual Suppression of the Slave Trade.	Section Seven.
6 & 7 Vict. c. 99	Appropriation Act 1843	An Act to apply a Sum out of the Consolidated Fund, and certain other Sums, to the Service of the Year One thousand eight hundred and forty-three, and to appropriate the Supplies granted in this Session of Parliament.	The whole act.
7 & 8 Vict. c. 2	Admiralty Offences Act 1844	An Act for the more speedy Trial of Offences committed on the High Seas.	Section Five.
7 & 8 Vict. c. 3	Actions for Gaming Act 1844	An Act to stay Proceedings,—Gaming, and to prevent any Proceedings being taken under those Statutes during such limited Time.	The whole act.
7 & 8 Vict. c. 6	Supply Act 1844	An Act to apply the Sum of Eight millions out of the Consolidated Fund to the Service of the Year One thousand eight hundred and forty-four.	The whole act.
7 & 8 Vict. c. 7	Gaming Transactions Act 1844	An Act to indemnify Witnesses who may give Evidence during this Session before either House of Parliament touching Gaming Transactions.	The whole act.
7 & 8 Vict. c. 9	Mutiny Act 1844	An Act for punishing Mutiny and Desertion, and for the better Payment of the Army and their Quarters.	The whole act.
7 & 8 Vict. c. 11	Marine Mutiny Act 1844	An Act for the Regulation of Her Majesty's Royal Marine Forces while on shore.	The whole act.
7 & 8 Vict. c. 12	International Copyright Act 1844	An Act to amend the Law relating to International Copyright.	Sections One and Twenty-one.
7 & 8 Vict. c. 14	Exchequer Bills Act 1844	An Act for raising the Sum of Eighteen millions four hundred and seven thousand three hundred Pounds by Exchequer Bills for the Service of the Year One thousand eight hundred and forty-four.	The whole act.
7 & 8 Vict. c. 15	Factories Act 1844	An Act to amend the Laws relating to Labour in Factories.	Section One. Section Two, the words "to serve upon any Jury, or". Section Fourteen to "but", from "and any" to "passing of this Act," and the words "in either Case". Section Eighteen to "and that". Section Nineteen to "operation". Section Twenty-eight to "and that". Section Thirty-one from "nor" to "any Saturday:". Section Thirty-four from "that no" to "Law; and". Sections Thirty-five, Forty, and Seventy-four.
7 & 8 Vict. c. 17	West Indian Islands Relief Act 1844	An Act for giving additional Powers to the Commissioners for the Relief of certain of Her Majesty's Colonies and Plantations in the West Indies.	Section One from "That so" to "repealed; and", and from "except as" to end of that Section. Section Five. Repealed as to all Her Majesty's Dominions.
7 & 8 Vict. c. 19	Inferior Courts Act 1844	An Act for regulating the Bailiffs of Inferior Courts.	Section Ten.
7 & 8 Vict. c. 22	Gold and Silver Wares Act 1844	An Act to amend the Laws now in force for preventing Frauds and Abuses in the marking of Gold and Silver Wares in England.	Sections One, Eighteen and Nineteen.
7 & 8 Vict. c. 23	Assaults (Ireland) Act 1844	An Act to continue for Five Years an Act of the Second and Third Years of Her present Majesty, for the better Prevention and Punishment of Assaults in Ireland.	The whole act.
7 & 8 Vict. c. 24	Forestalling, Regrating, etc. Act 1844	An Act for abolishing the Offences of forestalling, regrating, and engrossing, and for repealing certain Statutes passed in restraint of Trade.	Sections Two, Three and Five.
7 & 8 Vict. c. 25	Vinegar Act 1844	An Act to repeal the Duty of Excise on Vinegar, and to make the Duties and Drawbacks now payable on Flint Glass the same as on Bottle Glass.	Except Section Two from "every" to end of that Section and Sections Three and Four.
7 & 8 Vict. c. 27	Recovery of Advowsons in Ireland Act 1844	An Act to explain and amend an Act of the last Session of Parliament, intituled An Act for extending to Ireland,—and to explain and amend the said Act.	Section One.
7 & 8 Vict. c. 29	Night Poaching Act 1844	An Act to extend an Act of the Ninth Year of King George the Fourth, for the more effectual Prevention of Persons going armed by Night for the Destruction of Game.	Section Two.
7 & 8 Vict. c. 32	Bank Charter Act 1844	An Act to regulate the Issue of Bank Notes, and for giving to the Governor and Company of the Bank of England certain Privileges for a limited Period.	Section Eight. Section Nine from "and such" to end of that Section. Section Twenty-three from "the several Agreements" to "that Day". Section Twenty-nine.
7 & 8 Vict. c. 33	County Rates Act 1844	An Act for facilitating the Collection of County Rates, and for relieving High Constables from Attendance at Quarter Sessions in certain Cases, and from certain other Duties.	Section One from "from and" to "otherwise, then,". Section Five from "so" to "Constable as aforesaid,". Section Nine from "or under" to "Employment of the Poor,".
7 & 8 Vict. c. 35	Militia Ballots Suspension Act 1844	An Act to suspend until the Thirty-first Day of August One thousand eight hundred and forty-five the making of Lists and the Ballots and Enrolments for the Militia of the United Kingdom.	The whole act.
7 & 8 Vict. c. 36	Turnpike Acts (Ireland) Act 1844	An Act to continue until the Thirty-first Day of July One thousand eight hundred and forty-five, and to the End of the then Session of Parliament, certain Acts for regulating Turnpike Roads in Ireland.	The whole act.
7 & 8 Vict. c. 37	School Sites Act 1844	An Act to secure the Terms on which Grants are made by Her Majesty out of the Parliamentary Grant for the Education of the Poor; and to explain the Act of the Fifth Year of the Reign of Her present Majesty, for the Conveyance of Sites for Schools.	Section Six.
7 & 8 Vict. c. 38	Charitable Loan Societies (Ireland) Act 1844	An Act to amend an Act of the last Session, to consolidate and amend the Laws for the Regulation of Charitable Loan Societies in Ireland.	Section One. Section Two from "Provided also" to end of that Section. Section Three.
7 & 8 Vict. c. 40	Poor Rates Act 1844	An Act to continue until the First Day of October,—Stock in Trade or other Property, to the Relief of the Poor.	The whole act.
7 & 8 Vict. c. 41	Turnpike Acts (Great Britain) Act 1844	An Act to continue until the First Day of August One thousand eight hundred and forty-five, and to the End of the then Session of Parliament, certain Turnpike Acts.	The whole act.
7 & 8 Vict. c. 44	New Parishes (Scotland) Act 1844	An Act to facilitate the disjoining or dividing of extensive or populous Parishes, and the erecting of new Parishes, in that Part of the United Kingdom called Scotland.	Section One to "and that". Section Seventeen.
7 & 8 Vict. c. 45	Nonconformists Chapels Act 1844	An Act for the Regulation of Suits relating to Meeting Houses and other Property held for religious Purposes by Persons dissenting from the United Church of England and Ireland.	Section Three.
7 & 8 Vict. c. 46	Assessed Taxes, Property Tax, and Duty on Pensions and Offices of Profit Act 1844	An Act to continue, until the Fifth Day of April One thousand eight hundred and forty-six, Compositions for Assessed Taxes; and to amend certain Laws relating to Duties under the Management of the Commissioners of Stamps and Taxes.	Sections One and Two. Section Seven, the words "or any Three or more of them,". Section Eight.
7 & 8 Vict. c. 47	Linen Manufactures (Ireland) Act 1844	An Act to amend and continue for Five Years, and to the End of the next Session of Parliament, certain Acts relating to Linen, Hempen, and other Manufactures in Ireland.	Sections One and Six.
7 & 8 Vict. c. 48	Butter and Cheese Trade Act 1844	An Act to repeal certain Acts for regulating the Trade in Butter and Cheese.	The whole act.
7 & 8 Vict. c. 49	Post Office (Duties) Act 1844	An Act for the better Regulation of Colonial Posts.	Sections One, Seven and Eleven. Repealed as to all Her Majesty's Dominions.
7 & 8 Vict. c. 51	Soap Duties Allowances Act 1844	An Act to continue, until the End of the Session of Parliament next after the Thirty-first Day of July One thousand eight hundred and forty-six, certain of the Allowances of the Duty of Excise on Soap used in Manufactures.	The whole act.
7 & 8 Vict. c. 52	Parish Constables Act 1844	An Act to extend the Powers of the Act for the Appointment and Payment of Parish Constables.	Sections Two and Five.
7 & 8 Vict. c. 53	Disfranchisement of Sudbury Act 1844	An Act for Disfranchisement of the Borough of Sudbury.	The whole act.
7 & 8 Vict. c. 54	Loan Societies Act 1844	An Act to continue until the First Day of October One thousand eight hundred and forty-five, and to the End of the then Session of Parliament, the Act to amend the Laws relating to Loan Societies.	The whole act.
7 & 8 Vict. c. 55	Copyhold Act 1844	An Act to amend and explain the Acts for the Commutation,—Improvement of such Tenure.	Section Two. Section Four from "and on any" to end of that Section. Section Nine.
7 & 8 Vict. c. 57	Western Australia Government Act 1844	An Act to continue until the Thirty-first Day of December,—Settlements, in Western Australia on the Western Coast of New Holland.	The whole act.
7 & 8 Vict. c. 58	Actions for Gaming (No. 2) Act 1844	An Act further to stay until the End of the next Session,—during such further limited Time.	The whole act.
7 & 8 Vict. c. 60	Trafalgar Square Act 1844	An Act to provide for the Care and Preservation of Trafalgar Square in the City of Westminster.	Section Four.
7 & 8 Vict. c. 61	Counties (Detached Parts) Act 1844	An Act to annex detached Parts of Counties to the Counties in which they are situated.	Section Four from "and that" to end of that Section. Sections Six and Eight.
7 & 8 Vict. c. 63	Party Processions (Ireland) Act 1844	An Act to continue until the First Day of June One thousand eight hundred and forty-five an Act of the Second and Third Years of His late Majesty, for restraining for Five Years, in certain Cases, Party Processions in Ireland.	The whole act.
7 & 8 Vict. c. 67	Post Horse Licence Duties (Ireland) Act 1844	An Act to transfer the Collection of the Duty on Licences to let Horses for Hire in Ireland from the Commissioners of Stamps to the Commissioners of Excise.	Section Four.
7 & 8 Vict. c. 68	Ecclesiastical Courts Act 1844	An Act to suspend, until the Thirty-first Day of December,—and for obtaining Returns from and the Inspection of the Registers of such Jurisdictions.	Section One. Section Two, the words "granting Probates and Administrations or". Section Five.
7 & 8 Vict. c. 69	Judicial Committee Act 1844	An Act for amending an Act passed in the Fourth Year of the Reign of His late Majesty, intituled An Act for the better Administration of Justice in His Majesty's Privy Council; and to extend its Jurisdiction and Powers.	Section Five from "and no" to end of that Section. Sections Six, Seven and Thirteen.
7 & 8 Vict. c. 71	Middlesex Sessions Act 1844	An Act for the better Administration of Criminal Justice in Middlesex.	Sections Three, Six and Seven. Section Eleven from "after the Session" to "holden, and". Sections Twelve and Seventeen.
7 & 8 Vict. c. 75	Militia Pay Act 1844	An Act to defray until the First Day of August One thousand eight hundred and forty-five the Charge of the Pay,—Militia; and to authorize the Employment of the Non-commissioned Officers.	The whole act.
7 & 8 Vict. c. 77	Clerk of the Crown in Chancery Act 1844	An Act to amend so much of an Act of the Fifth and Sixth Years of His late Majesty as relates to the Salary of the Clerk of the Crown in Chancery; and to make other Provisions in respect of the said Office.	Section One to "thereof" and from "which shall" to end of that Section. Section Two from "and the Allowances" to "now paid;". Section Three.
7 & 8 Vict. c. 78	Unlawful Oaths (Ireland) Act 1844	An Act to continue for One Year an Act of the Second and Third Years,—preventing the administering and taking unlawful Oaths in Ireland.	The whole act.
7 & 8 Vict. c. 81	Marriages (Ireland) Act 1844	An Act for Marriages in Ireland; and for registering such Marriages.	Section Fifty to "but that". Section Seventy-seven from "and one" to "Majesty;". Section Eighty-five.
7 & 8 Vict. c. 82	Spirits (Ireland) Act 1844	An Act to continue for Five Years so much of an Act of the Second and Third Years of Her present Majesty, as enables Justices to grant Warrants for entering Places in which Spirits are sold without Licence in Ireland.	The whole act.
7 & 8 Vict. c. 85	Railway Regulation Act 1844	An Act to attach certain Conditions to the Construction of future Railways authorized or to be authorized by any Act of the present or succeeding Sessions of Parliament; and for other Purposes in relation to Railways.	Section Nineteen from "Provided" to end of that Section. Sections Twenty and Twenty-six.
7 & 8 Vict. c. 86	Solicitors (Clerks) Act 1844	An Act for the Relief of Clerks to Attornies and Solicitors who have omitted to enrol their Contracts; and for amending the Law relating to the Enrolment of such Contracts, and to the Disabilities of such Clerks, in certain Cases.	Except Section Four.
7 & 8 Vict. c. 87	Knackers Act 1844	An Act to amend the Law for regulating Places kept for slaughtering Horses.	Section Eight from "and the" to end of that Section.
7 & 8 Vict. c. 89	Commissioners of Woods (Audit) Act 1844	An Act for auditing the Accounts of the Commissioners of Her Majesty's Woods, Forests, Land Revenues, Works, and Buildings.	Section One from "shall be deemed" to "heretofore and", from "an Act of" to "force, or", and from "Provided" to end of that Section. Section Two from "declared" to "Exchequer". Section Four.
7 & 8 Vict. c. 90	Judgments (Ireland) Act 1844	An Act for the Protection of Purchasers against Judgments,—Laws in Ireland respecting Bankrupts and the Limitation of Actions.	Section Six. Section Twelve to "under this Act" and from "and the Cost of" to end of that Section. Sections Thirty-four, Thirty-five and Forty.
7 & 8 Vict. c. 91	South Wales Turnpike Trusts Act 1844	An Act to consolidate and amend the Laws relating to Turnpike Trusts in South Wales.	Sections One to Twenty-three, Twenty-seven and Twenty-nine to Thirty-three. Section Thirty-five from "or if any" to "Months,". Sections Thirty-nine to Forty-one. Section Forty-three to "determine; and". Sections Forty-four to Forty-six. Section Sixty-two from "of the Commissioners" to "determined,". Sections Sixty-five and Sixty-six. Section Sixty-seven from "for the said" to "determined," and the words "their or". Section Seventy-six. Section Seventy-eight from "of the said Commissioners, or" to "determined,". Section Eighty, the words "to the said Commissioners, or, after the said Commission shall have determined", from "for the said Commissioners" to "determined", the words "their or", the subsequent words "the said Commissioners or", and the word "respectively" (where it next thereafter occurs). Section Eighty-one from "of the said Commissioners" to "determined,". Section Ninety-one from "at" to "afterwards". Section Ninety-six from "Provided" to end of that Section. Section Ninety-nine from "and the High" to end of that Section. Sections One hundred and eight and One hundred and fifteen.
7 & 8 Vict. c. 92	Coroners Act 1844	An Act to amend the Law respecting the Office of County Coroner.	Sections One, Twenty-three and Thirty-one.
7 & 8 Vict. c. 94	New Parishes Act 1844	An Act to explain and amend an Act for making better Provision for the Spiritual Care of populous Parishes.	Section Twelve.
7 & 8 Vict. c. 96	Execution Act 1844	An Act to amend the Law of Insolvency, Bankruptcy, and Execution.	Sections Seventy and Seventy-one. Section Seventy-three from "the Word "Property" shall" to "Seal; and", and the subsequent words "of the said recited Act and", "respectively" and "by the said recited Act and". Sections Seventy-four and Seventy-five. Schedule (A.)
7 & 8 Vict. c. 97	Charitable Donations and Bequests (Ireland) Act 1844	An Act for the more effectual Application of Charitable Donations and Bequests in Ireland.	Sections One, Thirteen and Twenty-three.
7 & 8 Vict. c. 100	Arms (Ireland) Act 1844	An Act to supply an Omission in an Act of the Sixth and Seventh Years of Her present Majesty, for amending and continuing the Laws in Ireland relative to the registering of Arms, and the Importation, Manufacture, and Sale of Arms, Gunpowder, and Ammunition.	The whole act.
7 & 8 Vict. c. 101	Poor Law Amendment Act 1844	An Act for the further Amendment of the Laws relating to the Poor in England.	Sections One, Nine and Ten. Section Twelve from "after" to "next". Section Thirteen from "of an Act passed in the Forty-third" to "Kingdom, or" and the word "other". Section Fourteen to "and that". Section Fifteen from "Provided also" to end of that Section. Section Seventeen from "and that" to end of that Section. Sections Twenty-three, Twenty-seven and Twenty-eight. Section Thirty-two so far as it relates to powers of commissioners with regard to salaries of auditors. Sections Thirty-four and Thirty-seven. Section Fifty-one from "and where" to "a District School,". Sections Fifty-two, Sixty-seven, Seventy-six and Seventy-seven. Schedule (A.)
7 & 8 Vict. c. 102	Roman Catholics Act 1844	An Act to repeal certain Penal Enactments made against Her Majesty's Roman Catholic Subjects.	The whole act.
7 & 8 Vict. c. 104	Appropriation Act 1844	An Act to apply a Sum out of the Consolidated Fund and certain other Sums to the Service of the Year One thousand eight hundred and forty-four, and to appropriate the Supplies granted in this Session of Parliament.	The whole act.
7 & 8 Vict. c. 106	County Dublin Grand Jury Act 1844	An Act to consolidate and amend the Laws for the Regulation of Grand Jury Presentments in the County of Dublin.	Section One. Section Twenty-three from "Provided" to "distinct;" and so far as the rest of that Section relates to presentments for dispensaries. Sections Forty-nine, Fifty-two, Sixty and Ninety-eight. Section Ninety-nine from "and the Person to" to "Judgment:" and the words "shall be included in any such Applotment, or". Sections One hundred, One hundred and thirteen, One hundred and fifteen and One hundred and sixteen. Section One hundred and twenty-nine to "of the said County;". Sections One hundred and thirty-two and One hundred and thirty-three. Section One hundred and forty-three from "to be applied" to end of that Section. Section One hundred and forty-nine from "and all" to "shall direct;". Section One hundred and fifty-one from "and no" to end of that Section, and so far as the rest of that Section relates to plea of general issue. Section One hundred and fifty-five so far as it relates to venue.
7 & 8 Vict. c. 107	Common Law Offices (Ireland) Act 1844	An Act to regulate and reduce the Expences of the Offices attached to the Superior Courts of Law in Ireland payable out of the Consolidated Fund.	Sections One and Two. Section Three from "and the said" to "respectively set forth", the words "and the said Assistants and Clerks," and from "and that the said principal and other Officers, and Assistants" to end of that Section. Sections Four and Five. Section Seven from "and that when" to "such Junior Clerk:". Sections Twelve to Fourteen, Sixteen and Seventeen. Section Nineteen to "Year; and that". Section Twenty-eight so far as it relates to any officers therein mentioned, except the Master, the Clerk of the Rules, and the Marshal of the Marshalsea of the Four Courts at Dublin. Sections Thirty-four to Thirty-seven. Section Forty to "directed to be paid:". Sections Forty-one and Forty-two. Schedule (A.), the words "their Assistants and Clerks", "and Salaries", "Assistants, and Clerks respectively", "[Arthur Bushe, Esq.]" and "and Re-docketings", from "to check" to "such Duties,]" and from "Principal Assistant" to "[Mr. Richard Marlow]", the words "[Mr. Robert Cooper]", from "to receive and enter" to "Parliamentary Appearances;" and from "Assistant" (where it next thereafter occurs) to end of that Schedule, and the column for yearly salaries. Schedule (B.), the words "their Assistants and Clerks", "and Salaries", "Assistants, and Clerks respectively", "[The Honourable David Plunket]" and "and Re-docketings", from "to check" to "such Duties,]" and from "Principal Assistant" to "[Mr. William M. Mee]", the words "[Mr. John Clancy]", from "to receive and enter" to "Parliamentary Appearances;" and from "Assistant [Mr. James Lynam]" to end of that Schedule, and the column for yearly salaries. Schedule (C.), the words "their Assistants and Clerks", "and Salaries", "Assistants, and Clerks respectively", "[Robert Hitchcock, Esquire]" and "and Re-docketings", from "to check" to "such Duties,]" and from "Principal Assistant" to "Clerk [ ]" (under the head Rules Department), the words "[Mr. Arthur Greene]", from "to receive and enter" to "Parliamentary Appearances;" and from "Assistant [Mr. William Yeo]" to end of that Schedule, and the column for yearly salaries. Schedule (D).
7 & 8 Vict. c. 108	Fisheries (Ireland) Act 1844	An Act to amend an Act of the Sixth Year of Her present Majesty, intituled An Act to regulate the Irish Fisheries; and to empower the Constabulary Force to enforce certain Provisions respecting the Irish Fisheries.	Section Nine.
7 & 8 Vict. c. 109	Art Unions Indemnity Act 1844	An Act to indemnify Persons connected with Art Unions, and others, against certain Penalties.	The whole act.

== See also ==
- Statute Law Revision Act
