= Butter and Cheese Trade Act 1844 =

Act of the Parliament of the United Kingdom

- Act of Parliament
- Parliament of the United Kingdom
- Long title: An Act to repeal certain Acts for regulating the Trade in Butter and Cheese.
- Citation: 7 & 8 Vict. c. 48
- Territorial extent: United Kingdom

Dates
- Royal assent: 29 July 1844
- Commencement: 29 July 1844 (Note: The Acts of Parliament (Commencement) Act 1793.)
- Repealed: 7 August 1874
Other legislation
Repeals/revokes	See § Repealed enactments
Repealed by	Statute Law Revision Act 1874 (No. 2)

Status: Repealed

Text of statute as originally enacted

The Butter and Cheese Trade Act 1844 (7 & 8 Vict. c. 48) was an act of the Parliament of the United Kingdom that repealed enactments related to the trade in butter and cheese.

== Provisions ==
=== Repealed enactments ===
Section 1 of the act repealed 3 enactments, listed in the preamble to the act. The repeal did not revive any act, or any part of an act, repealed by any of the repealed acts.

Citation	Short title	Description	Extent of repeal
4 Will. & Mar. c. 7	Cheese and Butter Trade Act 1692	An Act passed in the Fourth Year of the Reign of King William the Third and Queen Mary, intituled An Act to prevent Abuses committed by the Traders in Butter and Cheese.	The whole act.
36 Geo. 3. c. 86	Sale of Butter Act 1796	An Act passed in the Thirty-sixth Year of the Reign of King George the Third, intituled An Act to prevent Abuses and Frauds in the packing, Weight, and Sale of Butter; and to repeal certain Acts relating thereto.	The whole act.
38 Geo. 3. c. 73	Packing, etc., of Butter Act 1798	An Act passed in the Thirty-eighth Year of the Reign of King George the Third, intituled An Act for amending and rendering more effectual an Act made in the Thirty-sixth Year of His present Majesty, intituled ‘An Act to prevent Abuses and Frauds in the packing, Weight, and Sale of Butter; and to repeal certain Acts relating thereto.’	The whole act.

== Subsequent developments ==
The whole act was repealed by section 1 of, and the schedule to, the Statute Law Revision Act 1874 (No. 2) (37 & 38 Vict. c. 96), which came into force on 7 August 1874.
