= Charitable Donations and Bequests (Ireland) Act 1844 =

Act of the Parliament of the United Kingdom

Charitable Donations and Bequests (Ireland) Act 1844 (Note: The citation of this act by this short title was authorised by section 1 of, and the first schedule to, the Short Titles Act 1896. Due to the repeal of those provisions it is now authorised by section 19(2) of the Interpretation Act 1978.)
- Act of Parliament
- Parliament of the United Kingdom
- Long title: An Act for the more effectual Application of Charitable Donations and Bequests in Ireland.
- Citation: 7 & 8 Vict. c. 97
- Territorial extent: United Kingdom

Dates
- Royal assent: 9 August 1844
- Commencement: 1 January 1845 (Note: Section 22.)
- Repealed: 1 November 1964 (Note: The Charities Act (Appointed Day) Order (Northern Ireland) 1964 (SI 1964/174).)
Other legislation
Amended by	Statute Law Revision Act 1874 (No. 2)
Repealed by	Charities Act (Northern Ireland) 1964

Status: Repealed

Text of statute as originally enacted

The Charitable Donations and Bequests (Ireland) Act 1844 (7 & 8 Vict. c. 97), also known as the Charitable Bequests Act, was an act of the Parliament of the United Kingdom, introduced by Sir Robert Peel in 1844, in an attempt to win over moderate Catholic support. The act enabled Catholics to leave money and items in their last will and testament to the Catholic Church. The act made parish priests less dependent on their parishioners for financial support.
