= Duchess of Kent's Annuity Act 1838 =

Act of the Parliament of the United Kingdom

- Act of Parliament
- Parliament of the United Kingdom
- Long title: An Act to enable Her Majesty to grant an annual Sum to Her Royal Highness Victoria Maria Louisa Duchess of Kent.
- Citation: 1 & 2 Vict. c. 8
- Territorial extent: United Kingdom

Dates
- Royal assent: 26 January 1838
- Commencement: 26 January 1838 (Note: The Acts of Parliament (Commencement) Act 1793.)
- Repealed: 7 August 1874
Other legislation
Repealed by	Statute Law Revision Act 1874 (No. 2)

Status: Repealed

Text of statute as originally enacted

The Duchess of Kent's Annuity Act 1838 (1 & 2 Vict. c. 8) was an act of the Parliament of the United Kingdom, signed into law on 26 January 1838. It empowered Queen Victoria to grant an annuity of £30,000 to her mother, the Duchess of Kent, on the condition that all previously existing annuities to the duchess were to cease.

== Subsequent developments ==
The whole act was repealed by section 1 of, and the schedule to, the Statute Law Revision Act 1874 (No. 2) (37 & 38 Vict. c. 96), which came into force on 9 August 1844.
