= Grand Jury (Ireland) Act 1838 =

Act of the Parliament of the United Kingdom

Grand Jury (Ireland) Act 1838 (Note: The citation of this act by this short title was authorised by section 1 of, and the first schedule to, the Short Titles Act 1896. Due to the repeal of those provisions it is now authorised by section 19(2) of the Interpretation Act 1978.)
- Act of Parliament
- Parliament of the United Kingdom
- Long title: An Act to empower the Foreman or any other Member of Grand Juries in Ireland to administer Oaths to Witnesses on Bills of Indictment.
- Citation: 1 & 2 Vict. c. 37
- Territorial extent: Ireland (Note: Section 1.)

Dates
- Royal assent: 27 July 1838
- Commencement: 27 July 1838 (Note: The Acts of Parliament (Commencement) Act 1793.)
- Repealed: 12 December 1969 (Note: The Grand Jury (Abolition) Act 1969 (Date of Commencement) Order (Northern Ireland) 1969 (SR&O 1969/309).)
Other legislation
Repealed by	Statute Law Revision Act 1874 (No. 2); Statute Law Revision (No. 2) Act 1890; Statute Law Revision Act (Northern Ireland) 1954; Perjury Act (Northern Ireland) 1946; Grand Jury (Abolition) Act (Northern Ireland) 1969

Status: Repealed

Text of statute as originally enacted

The Grand Jury (Ireland) Act 1838 (1 & 2 Vict. c. 37) was an act of the Parliament of the United Kingdom, signed into law on 27 July 1838. It established that bills of indictment laid before grand juries should be endorsed with the names of the witnesses, and empowered the juries to administer oaths or affirmations to the witnesses, which were to be taken under the normal penalties of perjury for falsehood.

== Bibliography ==
- The British almanac of the Society for the Diffusion of Useful Knowledge, for the year 1839. Society for the Diffusion of Useful Knowledge, London, 1839.
