= Quarter Sessions Act 1837 =

Act of the Parliament of the United Kingdom

Quarter Sessions Act 1837 (Note: The citation of this act by this short title was authorised by section 1 of, and the first schedule to, the Short Titles Act 1896. Due to the repeal of those provisions it is now authorised by section 19(2) of the Interpretation Act 1978.)
- Act of Parliament
- Parliament of the United Kingdom
- Long title: An Act to remove Doubts as to summoning Juries at Adjourned Quarter Sessions of the Peace.
- Citation: 1 & 2 Vict. c. 4
- Territorial extent: United Kingdom

Dates
- Royal assent: 23 December 1837
- Commencement: 23 December 1837 (Note: The Acts of Parliament (Commencement) Act 1793.)
- Repealed: 1 January 1972
Other legislation
| Amended by | Statute Law Revision Act 1874 (No. 2) |
| Repealed by | Courts Act 1971 |
| Relates to | Juries Act 1825 |

Status: Repealed

Text of statute as originally enacted

The Quarter Sessions Act 1837 (1 & 2 Vict. c. 4) was an act of the Parliament of the United Kingdom, signed into law on 23 December 1837. In order to remove doubts which existed on the subject, it enacted that juries could be summoned to attend adjourned quarter sessions.

== Subsequent developments ==
The whole act was repealed by section 56(4) of, and part I of schedule 11 to, the Courts Act 1971, which came into force on 1 January 1972.
