= List of acts of the Parliament of the United Kingdom from 1841 =

This is a complete list of acts of the Parliament of the United Kingdom for the year 1841.

Note that the first parliament of the United Kingdom was held in 1801; parliaments between 1707 and 1800 were either parliaments of Great Britain or of Ireland). For acts passed up until 1707, see the list of acts of the Parliament of England and the list of acts of the Parliament of Scotland. For acts passed from 1707 to 1800, see the list of acts of the Parliament of Great Britain. See also the list of acts of the Parliament of Ireland.

For acts of the devolved parliaments and assemblies in the United Kingdom, see the list of acts of the Scottish Parliament, the list of acts of the Northern Ireland Assembly, and the list of acts and measures of Senedd Cymru; see also the list of acts of the Parliament of Northern Ireland.

The number shown after each act's title is its chapter number. Acts passed before 1963 are cited using this number, preceded by the year(s) of the reign during which the relevant parliamentary session was held; thus the Union with Ireland Act 1800 is cited as "39 & 40 Geo. 3 c. 67", meaning the 67th act passed during the session that started in the 39th year of the reign of George III and which finished in the 40th year of that reign. Note that the modern convention is to use Arabic numerals in citations (thus "41 Geo. 3" rather than "41 Geo. III"). Acts of the last session of the Parliament of Great Britain and the first session of the Parliament of the United Kingdom are both cited as "41 Geo. 3".

Some of these acts have a short title. Some of these acts have never had a short title. Some of these acts have a short title given to them by later acts, such as by the Short Titles Act 1896.

== 4 & 5 Vict. ==
The fourth session of the 13th Parliament of the United Kingdom, which met from 26 January 1841 until 22 June 1841.

=== Public general acts ===
Short title	Citation	Royal assent
Long title
Annuity to Lord Keane, etc. Act 1841 (repealed)	4 & 5 Vict. c. 1	30 March 1841
An Act to settle an Annuity on Lord Keane, and the Two next surviving Heirs Male of the Body of the said Lord Keane to whom the Title of Lord Keane shall descend, in consideration of his great and brilliant Services. (Repealed by Statute Law Revision Act 1953 (2 & 3 Eliz. 2. c. 5))
Mutiny Act 1841 (repealed)	4 & 5 Vict. c. 2	30 March 1841
An Act for punishing Mutiny and Desertion and for the better Payment of the Army and their Quarters. (Repealed by Statute Law Revision Act 1874 (No. 2) (37 & 38 Vict. c. 96))
Marine Mutiny Act 1841 (repealed)	4 & 5 Vict. c. 3	30 March 1841
An Act for the Regulation of Her Majesty's Royal Marine Forces while on shore. (Repealed by Statute Law Revision Act 1874 (No. 2) (37 & 38 Vict. c. 96))
Supply Act 1841 (repealed)	4 & 5 Vict. c. 4	30 March 1841
An Act to apply the Sum of Eight Millions out of the Consolidated Fund to the Service of the Year One thousand eight hundred and forty-one. (Repealed by Statute Law Revision Act 1874 (No. 2) (37 & 38 Vict. c. 96))
Tithe Compositions (Ireland) Act 1841 (repealed)	4 & 5 Vict. c. 5	30 March 1841
An Act to facilitate the Recovery of Arrears of Tithe Compositions in Ireland vested in Her Majesty under the Provisions of an Act of the First and Second Years of Her present Majesty, (Note: Tithe Rentcharge (Ireland) Act 1838 (1 & 2 Vict. c. 109)) for abolishing Compositions for Tithes in Ireland, and for substituting Rent-charges in lieu thereof. (Repealed by Statute Law Revision Act 1874 (No. 2) (37 & 38 Vict. c. 96))
Turnpike Roads (Ireland) Act 1841 (repealed)	4 & 5 Vict. c. 6	6 April 1841
An Act to continue, until the Fourth Day of August One thousand eight hundred and forty-two, and to the End of the next Session of Parliament, the several Acts for regulating Turnpike Roads in Ireland which will expire at or before the End of the present Session, of Parliament, or at or before the End of the Session of Parliament next after the Fourth Day of August One thousand eight hundred and forty-one; and to amend the Acts for regulating Turnpike Roads in Ireland. (Repealed by Statute Law Revision Act 1874 (No. 2) (37 & 38 Vict. c. 96))
Census Act 1841 (repealed)	4 & 5 Vict. c. 7	6 April 1841
An Act to amend the Acts of the last Session for taking Account of the Population. (Repealed by Statute Law Revision Act 1874 (No. 2) (37 & 38 Vict. c. 96))
Duties on Rum, etc. Act 1841 (repealed)	4 & 5 Vict. c. 8	6 April 1841
An Act to reduce the Duty on Rum and Rum Shrub the Produce of and imported from certain British Possessions in the East Indies into the United Kingdom. (Repealed by Statute Law Revision Act 1874 (No. 2) (37 & 38 Vict. c. 96))
Turnpike Acts Continuance Act 1841 (repealed)	4 & 5 Vict. c. 9	6 April 1841
An Act for removing Doubts as to the Continuance of certain Local Turnpike Acts. (Repealed by Statute Law Revision Act 1874 (No. 2) (37 & 38 Vict. c. 96))
Burning of Houses (Dublin) Act 1841 (repealed)	4 & 5 Vict. c. 10	6 April 1841
An Act for extending to the County of the City of Dublin the Provisions of an Act passed in the Nineteenth and Twentieth Years of His late Majesty King George the Third, in Ireland, intituled "An Act to prevent the detestable Practices of houghing Cattle, burning of Houses, Barns, Haggards, and Corn, and for other Purposes," (Note: Malicious Damage (Houghing Cattle) Act 1779 (19 & 20 Geo. 3. c. 37 (I))) so far as relates to burning of Houses. (Repealed by Local Government (Ireland) Act 1898 (61 & 62 Vict. c. 37))
Indemnity Act 1841 (repealed)	4 & 5 Vict. c. 11	10 May 1841
An Act to indemnify such Persons in the United Kingdom as have omitted to qualify themselves for Offices and Employments, and to extend the Time limited for those Purposes respectively until the Twenty-fifth Day of March One thousand eight hundred and forty-two; and for the Relief of Clerks to Attornies and Solicitors in certain Cases. (Repealed by Promissory Oaths Act 1871 (34 & 35 Vict. c. 48))
Street from Coventry Street to Long Acre Act 1841	4 & 5 Vict. c. 12	10 May 1841
An Act to enable Her Majesty's Commissioners of Woods to make a new Street from Coventry Street, Piccadilly, to Long Acre, and for other Improvements in the Metropolis.
Loan to South Australia Act 1841 (repealed)	4 & 5 Vict. c. 13	10 May 1841
An Act to authorize the Advance of a Sum of Money out of the Consolidated Fund on account of the Colony of South Australia. (Repealed by Statute Law Revision Act 1861 (24 & 25 Vict. c. 101))
Trading Partnerships Act 1841 (repealed)	4 & 5 Vict. c. 14	18 May 1841
An Act to make good certain Contracts which have been or may be entered into by certain Banking and other Copartnerships. (Repealed by Statute Law (Repeals) Act 2004 (c. 14))
Monument to Sir Walter Scott Act 1841 (repealed)	4 & 5 Vict. c. 15	18 May 1841
An Act for the Erection at Edinburgh of a Monument to the late Sir Walter Scott. (Repealed by Edinburgh and Glasgow Railway Act 1844 (7 & 8 Vict. c. lviii) and Edinburgh Corporation Order Confirmation Act 1958 (7 & 8 Eliz. 2. c. v))
Dublin, Purchase of Land Act 1841	4 & 5 Vict. c. 16	18 May 1841
An Act to enable the Commissioners of Wide Streets to sell, and Her Majesty to purchase, certain Hereditaments in the City of Dublin on the North Bank of the River Anna Liffey.
Arrest in Personal Actions (Ireland) Act 1841 (repealed)	4 & 5 Vict. c. 17	18 May 1841
An Act to abolish Arrest in personal Actions commenced by Process of Subpœna at the Law Side of the Court of Exchequer in Ireland. (Repealed by Statute Law Revision Act 1874 (No. 2) (37 & 38 Vict. c. 96))
Abolition of Slavery Act 1841 (repealed)	4 & 5 Vict. c. 18	18 May 1841
An Act to make further Provision for facilitating and completing the Distribution and Payment of Compensation for Slaves upon the Abolition of Slavery. (Repealed by Court of Chancery (Funds) Act 1872 (35 & 36 Vict. c. 44))
Exchequer Bills Act 1841 (repealed)	4 & 5 Vict. c. 19	18 May 1841
An Act for raising the Sum of Eleven Millions by Exchequer Bills, for the Service of the Year One thousand eight hundred and forty-one. (Repealed by Statute Law Revision Act 1874 (No. 2) (37 & 38 Vict. c. 96))
Excise Management Act 1841 (repealed)	4 & 5 Vict. c. 20	18 May 1841
An Act to alter and amend certain Laws relating to the Collection and Management of the Duties of Excise. (Repealed by Customs and Excise Act 1952 (15 & 16 Geo. 6 & 1 Eliz. 2. c. 44))
Conveyance by Release Without Lease Act 1841 (repealed)	4 & 5 Vict. c. 21	18 May 1841
An Act for rendering a Release as effectual for the Conveyance of Freehold Estates as a Lease and Release by the same Parties. (Repealed by Statute Law Revision Act 1874 (No. 2) (37 & 38 Vict. c. 96))
Felony Act 1841 (repealed)	4 & 5 Vict. c. 22	21 June 1841
An Act to remove Doubts as to the Liability of Lords and Peers of Parliament to Punishment in certain Cases of Felony. (Repealed by Criminal Justice Act 1948 (11 & 12 Geo. 6. c. 58))
Militia Ballots Suspension Act 1841 (repealed)	4 & 5 Vict. c. 23	21 June 1841
An Act to suspend until the Thirty-first Day of August One thousand eight hundred and forty-two the making of Lists and the Ballots and Enrolments for the Militia of the United Kingdom. (Repealed by Statute Law Revision Act 1874 (No. 2) (37 & 38 Vict. c. 96))
Entailed Lands, etc. (Scotland) Act 1841 (repealed)	4 & 5 Vict. c. 24	21 June 1841
An Act to amend an Act to grant certain Powers to Heirs of Entail in Scotland, and to authorize the Sale of Entailed Lands for the Payment of certain Debts affecting the same. (Repealed by Statute Law Revision Act 1874 (No. 2) (37 & 38 Vict. c. 96))
Importation of Arms, etc. (Ireland) Act 1841 (repealed)	4 & 5 Vict. c. 25	21 June 1841
An Act to amend and continue for One Year, and to the End of the then next Session of Parliament, the several Acts relating to the Importation and keeping of Arms and Gunpowder in Ireland. (Repealed by Arms, etc. (Ireland) Act 1843 (6 & 7 Vict. c. 74))
Assessed Taxes Act 1841 (repealed)	4 & 5 Vict. c. 26	21 June 1841
An Act to continue Compositions for Assessed Taxes until the Fifth Day of April One thousand eight hundred and forty-three. (Repealed by Revenue Act 1869 (32 & 33 Vict. c. 14))
York House and Victoria Park Act 1841	4 & 5 Vict. c. 27	21 June 1841
An Act to enable Her Majesty's Commissioners of Woods to complete the Contract for the Sale of York House, and to purchase certain Lands for a Royal Park.
Frivolous Suits Act 1841 (repealed)	4 & 5 Vict. c. 28	21 June 1841
An Act to prevent Plaintiffs in certain frivolous Actions from obtaining their full Costs of Suit. (Repealed by Statute Law Revision Act 1874 (No. 2) (37 & 38 Vict. c. 96))
Sugar Duties Act 1841 (repealed)	4 & 5 Vict. c. 29	21 June 1841
An Act for granting to Her Majesty, until the Fifth Day of July One thousand eight hundred and forty-two, certain Duties on Sugar imported into the United Kingdom, for the Service of the Year One thousand eight hundred and forty-one. (Repealed by Statute Law Revision Act 1874 (No. 2) (37 & 38 Vict. c. 96))
Ordnance Survey Act 1841	4 & 5 Vict. c. 30	21 June 1841
An Act to authorize and facilitate the Completion of a Survey of Great Britain, Berwick upon Tweed, and the Isle of Man.
Court Houses (Ireland) Act 1841 (repealed)	4 & 5 Vict. c. 31	21 June 1841
An Act to provide for the Surrender of Premises formerly used for Court Houses, but no longer used for that Purpose, in Ireland. (Repealed by Statute Law Revision Act 1874 (No. 2) (37 & 38 Vict. c. 96))
Vaccination Act 1841 (repealed)	4 & 5 Vict. c. 32	21 June 1841
An Act to amend an Act to extend the Practice of Vaccination. (Repealed for England and Wales by Vaccination Act 1867 (30 & 31 Vict. c. 84) and for Ireland by Statute Law Revision Act 1875 (38 & 39 Vict. c. 66))
Turnpike Tolls Act 1841 (repealed)	4 & 5 Vict. c. 33	21 June 1841
An Act to amend the Acts for regulating Turnpike Roads in England, so far as they relate to certain Exemptions from Toll. (Repealed by Statute Law (Repeals) Act 1981 (c. 19))
Stamps Act 1841 (repealed)	4 & 5 Vict. c. 34	21 June 1841
An Act to explain and amend an Act of the Fifth Year of King George the Fourth, (Note: Stamps Act 1824 (5 Geo. 4. c. 41)) for repealing certain Duties on Law Proceedings in the Courts in Great Britain and Ireland respectively, and for better protecting the Duties payable upon stamped Vellum, Parchment, or Paper. (Repealed by Inland Revenue Repeal Act 1870 (33 & 34 Vict. c. 99))
Copyhold Act 1841 or the Enfranchisement of Copyholds Act 1841 (repealed)	4 & 5 Vict. c. 35	21 June 1841
An Act for the Commutation of certain Manorial Rights in respect of Lands of Copyhold and Customary Tenure, and in respect of other Lands subject to such Rights, and for facilitating the Enfranchisement of such Lands, and for the Improvement of such Tenure. (Repealed by Copyhold Act 1894 (57 & 58 Vict. c. 46))
Tithes Act 1841 (repealed)	4 & 5 Vict. c. 36	21 June 1841
An Act to amend an Act of the Fifth and Sixth Years of King William the Fourth, (Note: Tithes Act 1835 (5 & 6 Will. 4. c. 74)) "for the more easy Recovery of Tithes;" and to take away the Jurisdiction from the Ecclesiastical Courts in all Matters relating to Tithes of a certain Amount. (Repealed by Statute Law Revision (No. 2) Act 1888 (51 & 52 Vict. c. 57))
Tithe Compositions (Ireland) Act 1841 (repealed)	4 & 5 Vict. c. 37	21 June 1841
An Act for the more easy Recovery of Arrears of Compositions for Tithes from Persons of the Persuasion of the People called Quakers, in Ireland. (Repealed by Statute Law Revision Act 1874 (No. 2) (37 & 38 Vict. c. 96))
School Sites Act 1841	4 & 5 Vict. c. 38	21 June 1841
An Act to afford further Facilities for the Conveyance and Endowment of Sites for Schools.
Ecclesiastical Commissioners Act 1841	4 & 5 Vict. c. 39	21 June 1841
An Act to explain and amend Two several Acts relating to the Ecclesiastical Commissioners for England.
Metropolitan Improvements Act 1841 (repealed)	4 & 5 Vict. c. 40	21 June 1841
An Act to empower the Commissioners of Her Majesty's Woods to raise Money for certain Improvements in the Metropolis on the Security of the Land Revenues of the Crown within the County of Middlesex and City of London. (Repealed by Crown Estate Act 1961 (9 & 10 Eliz. 2. c. 55))
Houses of Industry, etc. (Ireland) Act 1841 (repealed)	4 & 5 Vict. c. 41	21 June 1841
An Act to provide for the Payment of Debts, Charges, and Incumbrances affecting Houses of Industry and Workhouses, and of Advances made, conformably with previous Usage, for the lawful Purposes of such Houses of Industry and Workhouses, in certain Cases, in Ireland. (Repealed by Statute Law Revision Act 1874 (No. 2) (37 & 38 Vict. c. 96))
Winterbourne Parish Act 1841	4 & 5 Vict. c. 42	21 June 1841
An Act to remove Doubts as to the Division of the Parish of Winterbourne in the County of Gloucester into Two Parishes.
Western Australia Government Act 1841 (repealed)	4 & 5 Vict. c. 43	21 June 1841
An Act to continue until the Thirty-first Day of December One thousand eight hundred and forty-two, and until the End of the then next Session of Parliament, an Act of the Tenth Year of King George the Fourth, (Note: Government of Western Australia Act 1829 (10 Geo. 4. c. 22)) for providing for the Government of His Majesty's Settlements in Western Australia on the Western Coast of New Holland. (Repealed by Statute Law Revision Act 1874 (No. 2) (37 & 38 Vict. c. 96))
New South Wales, etc. Government Act 1841 (repealed)	4 & 5 Vict. c. 44	21 June 1841
An Act to continue until the Thirty-first Day of December One thousand eight hundred and forty-two, and from thence until the End of the next ensuing Session of Parliament, certain Acts for providing for the Administration of Justice in New South Wales and Van Diemen's Land, and for the more effectual Government thereof. (Repealed by Statute Law Revision Act 1874 (No. 2) (37 & 38 Vict. c. 96))
Sewers Act 1841 (repealed)	4 & 5 Vict. c. 45	21 June 1841
An Act to amend an Act passed in the Third and Fourth Years of the Reign of His late Majesty King William the Fourth, intituled "An Act to amend the Laws relating to Sewers." (Note: Sewers Act 1833 (3 & 4 Will. 4. c. 22)) (Repealed by Land Drainage Act 1930 (20 & 21 Geo. 5. c. 44))
Tralee Navigation Act 1841	4 & 5 Vict. c. 46	21 June 1841
An Act to empower the Commissioners for the Issue of Exchequer Bills for public Works to complete the Works authorized to be made by an Act of the Sixth and Seventh Years of His late Majesty King William the Fourth, (Note: Tralee Navigation and Harbour Act 1836 (6 & 7 Will. 4. c. cxiv)) for improving the Navigation and Harbour of Tralee in the County of Kerry; and to extend the Time for that Purpose.
Insolvent Debtors (Ireland) Act 1841 (repealed)	4 & 5 Vict. c. 47	21 June 1841
An Act to amend an Act of the last Session for continuing and amending the Laws for the Relief of Insolvent Debtors in Ireland. (Repealed by Irish Bankrupt and Insolvent Act 1857 (20 & 21 Vict. c. 60))
Municipal Corporations, Poor Rates Act 1841 (repealed)	4 & 5 Vict. c. 48	21 June 1841
An Act to render certain Municipal Corporations rateable to the Relief of the Poor in certain Cases. (Repealed by Municipal Corporations Act 1882 (45 & 46 Vict. c. 50))
County Bridges Act 1841 (repealed)	4 & 5 Vict. c. 49	21 June 1841
An Act to provide for repairing, improving, and rebuilding County Bridges. (Repealed by Statute Law Revision (No. 2) Act 1890 (53 & 54 Vict. c. 51))
Bank Notes Act 1841 (repealed)	4 & 5 Vict. c. 50	21 June 1841
An Act to make further Provision relative to the Returns to be made by Banks of the Amount of their Notes in Circulation. (Repealed by Statute Law Revision Act 1874 (No. 2) (37 & 38 Vict. c. 96))
Highway Act 1841 (repealed)	4 & 5 Vict. c. 51	21 June 1841
An Act to amend an Act of the Third Year of King George the Fourth, (Note: Turnpike Roads Act 1822 (3 Geo. 4. c. 126)) for regulating Turnpike Roads in England, and also an Act of the Fifth and Sixth Years of King William the Fourth, (Note: Highway Act 1835 (5 & 6 Will. 4. c. 50)) for consolidating the Laws relating to Highways in England. (Repealed by Highways Act 1959 (7 & 8 Eliz. 2. c. 25) and London Government Act 1963 (c. 33))
Court of Chancery (No. 1) Act 1841 (repealed)	4 & 5 Vict. c. 52	21 June 1841
An Act to amend an Act of the Fourth Year of Her present Majesty, intituled "An Act for facilitating the Administration of Justice in the Court of Chancery." (Note: Court of Chancery Act 1840 (3 & 4 Vict. c. 94)) (Repealed by Statute Law Revision Act 1874 (No. 2) (37 & 38 Vict. c. 96))
Appropriation Act 1841 (repealed)	4 & 5 Vict. c. 53	22 June 1841
An Act to apply certain Sums of Money to the Service of the Year One thousand eight hundred and forty-one, and to appropriate the Supplies granted in this Session of Parliament. (Repealed by Statute Law Revision Act 1874 (No. 2) (37 & 38 Vict. c. 96))
Usury Act 1841 (repealed)	4 & 5 Vict. c. 54	22 June 1841
An Act to continue until the First Day of January One thousand eight hundred and forty-four an Act of the last Session of Parliament, (Note: Usury Act 1840 (3 & 4 Vict. c. 83)) for continuing an Act for amending and extending the Provisions of an Act of the First Year of Her present Majesty, (Note: Usury Act 1837 (7 Will. 4 & 1 Vict. c. 80)) for exempting certain Bills of Exchange and Promissory Notes from the Operation of the Laws relating to Usury. (Repealed by Statute Law Revision Act 1874 (No. 2) (37 & 38 Vict. c. 96))
Loan Societies Act 1841 (repealed)	4 & 5 Vict. c. 55	22 June 1841
An Act further to continue, until the First Day of April One thousand eight hundred and forty-two, an Act of the Third and Fourth Year of the Reign of Her present Majesty, intituled "An Act to amend the Laws relating to Loan Societies." (Note: Loan Societies Act 1840 (3 & 4 Vict. c. 110)) (Repealed by Statute Law Revision Act 1874 (No. 2) (37 & 38 Vict. c. 96))
Substitution of Punishments for Death Act 1841 or the Substitution of Punishments of Death Act 1841 (repealed)	4 & 5 Vict. c. 56	22 June 1841
An Act for taking away the Punishment of Death, and substituting other Punishments in lieu thereof. (Repealed by Customs and Inland Revenue Act 1890 (53 & 54 Vict. c. 8))
Parliamentary Elections Act 1841 (repealed)	4 & 5 Vict. c. 57	22 June 1841
An Act for the Prevention of Bribery at Elections. (Repealed by Parliamentary Elections Act 1868 (31 & 32 Vict. c. 125))
Controverted Elections Act 1841 (repealed)	4 & 5 Vict. c. 58	22 June 1841
An Act to amend the Law for the Trial of controverted Elections. (Repealed by Statute Law Revision Act 1874 (No. 2) (37 & 38 Vict. c. 96))
Application of Highway Rates to Turnpikes Act 1841 (repealed)	4 & 5 Vict. c. 59	22 June 1841
An Act to authorize for One Year, and until the End of the then next Session of Parliament, the Application of a Portion of the Highway Rates to Turnpike Roads, in certain Cases. (Repealed by Statute Law (Repeals) Act 1981 (c. 19))
Madhouses, etc. (Scotland) Act 1841 (repealed)	4 & 5 Vict. c. 60	22 June 1841
An Act to alter and amend certain Acts regulating Madhouses in Scotland, and to provide for the Custody of dangerous Lunatics. (Repealed by Lunacy (Scotland) Act 1857 (20 & 21 Vict. c. 71))
Militia Pay Act 1841 (repealed)	4 & 5 Vict. c. 61	22 June 1841
An Act to defray the Charge of the Pay, Clothing, and contingent and other Expences of the Disembodied Militia in Great Britain and Ireland; and to grant Allowances in certain Cases to Subaltern Officers, Adjutants, Paymasters, Quartermasters, Surgeons, Assistant Surgeons, Surgeons Mates, and Serjeant Majors of the Militia, until the First Day of July One thousand eight hundred and forty-two. (Repealed by Statute Law Revision Act 1874 (No. 2) (37 & 38 Vict. c. 96))

=== Local acts ===
Short title	Citation	Royal assent
Long title
London and South Western Railway Act 1841	4 & 5 Vict. c. i	30 March 1841
An Act to amend the Acts relating to the London and South-western Railway Company.
Preston and Longridge Railway Act 1841	4 & 5 Vict. c. ii	30 March 1841
An Act to enable the Preston and Longridge Railway Company to raise a further Sum of Money.
Whitby Improvement Act 1841	4 & 5 Vict. c. iii	30 March 1841
An Act to alter and amend the Powers and Provisions of an Act passed in the Seventh Year of the Reign of King William the Fourth, intituled "An Act for better paving, cleansing, lighting, watching, and improving the Town of Whitby in the North Riding of the County of York;" (Note: Whitby (Yorkshire) Improvement Act 1837 (7 Will. 4. & 1 Vict. c. x)) and to allow a Drawback in certain Cases from the Duties thereby granted.
York and London Assurance Company Act 1841	4 & 5 Vict. c. iv	30 March 1841
An Act for regulating Legal Proceedings by or against the York and London Assurance Company.
Glasgow, Paisley and Greenock Railway Act 1841	4 & 5 Vict. c. v	6 April 1841
An Act to enable "The Glasgow, Paisley, and Greenock Railway Company" to raise a further Sum of Money; and to amend and enlarge the Powers and Provisions of the Acts relating to the said Railway.
Durham and Sunderland Railway Act 1841	4 & 5 Vict. c. vi	6 April 1841
An Act to enable the Durham and Sunderland Railway Company to raise a further Sum of Money; and for amending the Acts for making the said Railway.
York and North Midland Railway Act 1841	4 & 5 Vict. c. vii	6 April 1841
An Act to enable the York and North Midland Railway Company to raise a further Sum of Money; to make a certain Approach to the said Railway; and to amend the Acts relating thereto.
Manchester and Salford Waterworks Act 1841	4 & 5 Vict. c. viii	6 April 1841
An Act to enable the Company of Proprietors of the Manchester and Salford Waterworks to raise a further Sum of Money; and to amend the Acts relating thereto.
Britannia Life Assurance Company Act 1841	4 & 5 Vict. c. ix	10 May 1841
An Act for regulating Legal Proceedings by or against the Britannia Life Assurance Company.
Chard Canal Act 1841	4 & 5 Vict. c. x	10 May 1841
An Act to amend the Acts relating to the Chard Canal.
Wishaw and Coltness Railway Act 1841	4 & 5 Vict. c. xi	10 May 1841
An Act for enabling the Wishaw and Coltness Railway Company to raise a further Sum of Money.
London and Blackwall Railway Act 1841	4 & 5 Vict. c. xii	10 May 1841
An Act for granting further Powers to the London and Blackwall Railway Company.
North Midland Railway Act 1841 (repealed)	4 & 5 Vict. c. xiii	10 May 1841
An Act for granting further Powers to the North Midland Railway Company. (Repealed by Midland Railway Consolidation Act 1844 (7 & 8 Vict. c. xviii))
Eastern Counties Railway Act 1841 (repealed)	4 & 5 Vict. c. xiv	10 May 1841
An Act to amend and enlarge some of the Provisions of the Acts relating to the Eastern Counties Railway, and to authorize the Company to raise a further Sum of Money for the Purposes of the said Undertaking. (Repealed by Great Eastern Railway Act 1862 (25 & 26 Vict. c. ccxxiii))
Derby Gas Act 1841 (repealed)	4 & 5 Vict. c. xv	10 May 1841
An Act for better lighting with Gas the Borough of Derby and several Parishes and Places adjacent thereto. (Repealed by Derby Gas Act 1852 (15 & 16 Vict. c. xiv))
Harrogate Improvement Act 1841 (repealed)	4 & 5 Vict. c. xvi	10 May 1841
An Act for improving certain Parts of the Townships of Bilton with Harrowgate and Pannal, called High and Low Harrowgate, in the West Riding of the County of York; for protecting the Mineral Springs and regulating the Stinted Pasture in the said Townships. (Repealed by Harrogate Stray Act 1985 (c. xxii))
St. Luke Chelsea Poor Laws and Highways Act 1841 or the Chelsea Improvement Act 1841	4 & 5 Vict. c. xvii	10 May 1841
An Act for the Administration of the Poor Laws in the Parish of Saint Luke Chelsea in the County of Middlesex, and relating to the Highways in the said Parish.
River Annan Fisheries Act 1841 (repealed)	4 & 5 Vict. c. xviii	10 May 1841
An Act for the more effectual Preservation and Improvement of the Fisheries in the River Annan in the County of Dumfries, and in the Streams and Waters running into the same, and on the Shores or Sea Coast adjacent to the Mouth or Entrance of the said River. (Repealed by Salmon and Freshwater Fisheries (Protection) (Scotland) Act 1951 (14 & 15 Geo. 6. c. 26))
Ilminster Roads Act 1841	4 & 5 Vict. c. xix	10 May 1841
An Act for more effectually repairing and improving certain Roads passing through or near the Town of Ilminster in the County of Somerset
Stumpcross Roads Act 1841 (repealed)	4 & 5 Vict. c. xx	10 May 1841
An Act for maintaining certain Roads in the County of Cambridge, to be called "The Stumpcross Roads." (Repealed by Annual Turnpike Acts Continuance Act 1870 (33 & 34 Vict. c. 73))
Barnstaple Roads Act 1841 (repealed)	4 & 5 Vict. c. xxi	10 May 1841
An Act for repairing several Roads leading from the Town of Barnstaple in the County of Devon, and for making several new Lines of Road connected therewith. (Repealed by Barnstaple Turnpike Roads Act 1865 (28 & 29 Vict. c. clxiii))
Christchurch and Lyndhurst Road Act 1841	4 & 5 Vict. c. xxii	10 May 1841
An Act for more effectually repairing the Road from the Western Side of the New Forest near Christchurch to the Boundary of the Parish of Lyndhurst, all in the County of Hants.
Wimborne Minster and Piddletown Turnpike Road (Dorset) Act 1841	4 & 5 Vict. c. xxiii	10 May 1841
An Act for making a Turnpike Road from Wimborne Minster in the County of Dorset to Piddletown in the same County, with certain Branches therefrom.
Northern and Eastern Railway Act 1841	4 & 5 Vict. c. xxiv	18 May 1841
An Act to enable the Northern and Eastern Railway Company to make certain Deviations in the Line of their Railway, and to alter and amend the several Acts relating to the said Railway.
Manchester and Leeds Railway Act 1841	4 & 5 Vict. c. xxv	18 May 1841
An Act for enabling the Manchester and Leeds Railway Company to raise a further Sum of Money.
West Durham Railway Act 1841	4 & 5 Vict. c. xxvi	18 May 1841
An Act to enable the West Durham Railway Company to raise a further Sum of Money; and to amend the Act (Note: West Durham Railway Act 1839 (2 & 3 Vict. c. lxxi)) relating to the said Railway.
Old and New Accrington and Church Townships Gas and Water Act 1841 (repealed)	4 & 5 Vict. c. xxvii	18 May 1841
An Act to light with Gas and supply with Water the Townships of Old and New Accrington and Church in the County Palatine of Lancaster. (Repealed by Accrington Gas and Waterworks Company's Act 1854 (17 & 18 Vict. c. lxxxvii))
Lancashire Towns Gas Act 1841 (repealed)	4 & 5 Vict. c. xxviii	18 May 1841
An Act to alter, amend, and enlarge the Powers and Provisions of an Act (Note: Liverpool and Toxteth Park Gas Act 1818 (58 Geo. 3. c. lxvi)) for lighting with Gas the Port and Town of Liverpool and Township of Toxteth Park in the County of Lancaster; and for lighting with Gas the several Townships of West Derby, Everton, Kirkdale, Walton-on-the-Hill, Booth cum Linacre, Litherland, Great Crosby, Wavertree, and Garston, in the County of Lancaster. (Repealed by Liverpool Gaslight Company Act 1847 (10 & 11 Vict. c. lxvii))
Clifton Suspension Bridge Act 1841 (repealed)	4 & 5 Vict. c. xxix	18 May 1841
An Act for enlarging the Powers of the Acts (Note: Clifton Suspension Bridge Act 1830 (11 Geo. 4 & 1 Will. 4. c. lxix)) (Note: Clifton Suspension Bridge Act 1836 (6 & 7 Will. 4. c. vi)) for building a Bridge over the River Avon, from Clifton to the opposite Side of the River in the County of Somerset. (Repealed by Clifton Suspension Bridge Act 1952 (15 & 16 Geo. 6 & 1 Eliz. 2. c. xli))
Liverpool Docks, Harbours and Quays Act 1841 (repealed)	4 & 5 Vict. c. xxx	18 May 1841
An Act for enabling the Trustees of the Liverpool Docks to erect Transit Sheds on the West Quay of the Princes Dock, to make a Wet Dock with Warehouses on the Quays, and to construct other Works, and to raise a further Sum of Money; and for enlarging the Powers of the Acts relating to the Docks and Harbour of Liverpool; and for other Purposes relating thereto. (Repealed by Mersey Dock Acts Consolidation Act 1858 (21 & 22 Vict. c. xcii))
Plymouth and Exeter Road Act 1841 (repealed)	4 & 5 Vict. c. xxxi	18 May 1841
An Act to repeal certain of the Provisions of an Act passed in the First Year of the Reign of His Majesty King George the Fourth, (Note: Plymouth and Exeter Road Act 1820 (1 Geo. 4. c. xxi)) for improving Parts of the Line of Road between the Borough of Plymouth and the City of Exeter, through Ashburton and Chudleigh, in the County of Devon. (Repealed by Exeter Turnpike Roads Act 1852 (15 & 16 Vict. c. cliv))
Brent Bridge and Plymouth (Gasking Street) Road Act 1841	4 & 5 Vict. c. xxxii	18 May 1841
An Act for repairing the Road leading from Brent Bridge in the County of Devon to Gashing Street in or near the Borough of Plymouth in the said County.
Cranford Bridge and Maidenhead Bridge Road Act 1841 (repealed)	4 & 5 Vict. c. xxxiii	18 May 1841
An Act for more effectually repairing the Road from Cranford Bridge to Maidenhead Bridge, with Roads thereout to Eton Town End and to the Great Western Railway, and from Langley Broom to Datchet Bridge, all in the Counties of Middlesex and Bucks. (Repealed by Annual Turnpike Acts Continuance Act 1870 (33 & 34 Vict. c. 73))
Coventry to Warwick and Coventry to Martyn's Cutter Roads Act 1841	4 & 5 Vict. c. xxxiv	18 May 1841
An Act for repairing the Roads from Coventry to Warwick, and from Coventry to Martyn's Cutter in the County of the City of Coventry and in the County of Warwick, and other Roads communicating therewith, in the said County of Warwick.
Road from Market Harborough to Brampton (Huntingdonshire) Road Act 1841	4 & 5 Vict. c. xxxv	18 May 1841
An Act for more effectually repairing and improving the Road from Market Harborough in the County of Leicester to Brampton in the County of Huntingdon.
Glasgow Juvenile Delinquency Act 1841 (repealed)	4 & 5 Vict. c. xxxvi	21 June 1841
An Act for repressing Juvenile Delinquency in the City of Glasgow. (Repealed by Glasgow Juvenile Delinquency Prevention and Repression Act 1878 (41 & 42 Vict. c. cxxi))
Birkenhead Holy Trinity Church Act 1841	4 & 5 Vict. c. xxxvii	21 June 1841
An Act for completing and maintaining a new Church in Birkenhead in the County of Chester.
Great North of England Railway Act 1841	4 & 5 Vict. c. xxxviii	21 June 1841
An Act for amending and enlarging the Provisions of the several Acts relating to the Great North of England Railway Company, and for other Purposes relating thereto.
London and South Western Railway (Wandsworth Water) Act 1841	4 & 5 Vict. c. xxxix	21 June 1841
An Act to amend the Acts relating to the London and South-western Railway Company; and to authorize an Agreement between the said Company and certain Inhabitants of Wandsworth and Battersea respecting an alleged Loss in their Supply of Water.
Great Leinster and Munster Railway Act 1841	4 & 5 Vict. c. xl	21 June 1841
An Act for extending, enlarging, and amending some of the Provisions of the Act (Note: Great Leinster and Munster Railway Act 1837 (7 Will. 4 & 1 Vict. c. civ)) relating to the Great Leinster and Munster Railway.
Bristol and Exeter Railway Act 1841	4 & 5 Vict. c. xli	21 June 1841
An Act for extending and enlarging some of the Provisions of the Acts relating to the Bristol and Exeter Railway.
Northern and Eastern Railway (Broxbourne, &c. Branch Line) Act 1841	4 & 5 Vict. c. xlii	21 June 1841
An Act to enable the Northern and Eastern Railway Company to make a Branch Line of Railway; and to alter and amend the several Acts relating to the said Railway.
Wilsontown, Morningside and Coltness Railway Act 1841 (repealed)	4 & 5 Vict. c. xliii	21 June 1841
An Act for making a Railway to be called the Wilsontown, Morningside, and Coltness Railway, in the Counties of Lanark and Linlithgow. (Repealed by Edinburgh and Glasgow Railway (Wilsontown, Morningside and Coltness Railway Transfer) Act 1849 (12 & 13 Vict. c. lxxii))
Newcastle-upon-Tyne and Carlisle Railway Act 1841	4 & 5 Vict. c. xliv	21 June 1841
An Act to alter, amend, and enlarge the Powers granted to the Newcastle-upon-Tyne and Carlisle Railway Company; and to authorize Alterations in the Line of the Railway.
Wells (Somerset) Markets Act 1841	4 & 5 Vict. c. xlv	21 June 1841
An Act for improving and regulating the Markets within the City and Borough of Wells in the County of Somerset.
Exmouth Market Act 1841 (repealed)	4 & 5 Vict. c. xlvi	21 June 1841
An Act to alter, amend, and enlarge the Powers and Provisions of an Act passed in the First Year of the Reign of Her present Majesty, intituled "An Act for regulating the Market in the Town of Exmouth in the County of Devon." (Note: Exmouth Market Act 1838 (1 & 2 Vict. c. v)) (Repealed by Exmouth Market Act 1867 (30 & 31 Vict. c. xix))
King's Lynn Port Act 1841 (repealed)	4 & 5 Vict. c. xlvii	21 June 1841
An Act to alter and amend an Act passed in the Thirteenth Year of the Reign of King George the Third, (Note: King's Lynn Pilotage Act 1772 (13 Geo. 3. c. 30)) for the better Regulation of Pilots and Bridgemen, and for laying down Moorings and preventing Mischief by Fire, in the Port of King's Lynn. (Repealed by Pilotage Orders Confirmation (No. 1) Act 1922 (12 & 13 Geo. 5. c. xxxvii))
Belfast Port and Harbour Improvement Act 1841 (repealed)	4 & 5 Vict. c. xlviii	21 June 1841
An Act to amend an Act (Note: Belfast Port and Harbour Act 1837 (7 Will. 4 & 1 Vict. c. lxxvi)) for the Formation of a new Cut or Channel, and for otherwise more effectually improving the Port and Harbour of Belfast. (Repealed by Belfast Harbour Act 1847 (10 & 11 Vict. c. lii))
Gourdon Harbour Act 1841 (repealed)	4 & 5 Vict. c. xlix	21 June 1841
An Act for maintaining Gourdon Harbour in the County of Kincardine. (Repealed by Grampian Regional Council (Harbours) Order Confirmation Act 1987 (c. x))
Scrabster Harbour Act 1841	4 & 5 Vict. c. l	21 June 1841
An Act for making and maintaining a Harbour at Scrabster Roads in the Bay of Thurso and County of Caithness, and Road thereto.
Newport Dock Company Act 1841	4 & 5 Vict. c. li	21 June 1841
An Act for authorizing the Newport Dock Company to raise an additional Sum of Money; and to amend the Acts relating thereto.
Ipswich Dock Commission Act 1841 (repealed)	4 & 5 Vict. c. lii	21 June 1841
An Act to enable the Ipswich Dock Commissioners to raise a further Sum of Money. (Repealed by Ipswich Port Authority Act 1986 (c. xv))
Portbury Pier (Somerset) Act 1841 (repealed)	4 & 5 Vict. c. liii	21 June 1841
An Act for making a Pier in the Parish of Portbury in the County of Somerset, with Works and Approaches connected therewith. (Repealed by Portbury Pier and Railway Act 1846 (9 & 10 Vict. c. cccxliv))
Monkland Canal Company Act 1841	4 & 5 Vict. c. liv	21 June 1841
An Act to enable the Monkland Canal Company to raise a further Sum of Money.
Forth and Clyde Navigation Act 1841	4 & 5 Vict. c. lv	21 June 1841
An Act to consolidate, amend, and enlarge the Powers and Provisions of the several Acts relating to the Forth and Clyde Navigation.
Newry Navigation Act 1841	4 & 5 Vict. c. lvi	21 June 1841
An Act to extend and amend the Acts relating to the Newry Navigation.
St. Ives Pilchard Fishery Act 1841	4 & 5 Vict. c. lvii	21 June 1841
An Act to repeal an Act passed in the Sixteenth Year of the Reign of His Majesty King George the Third, (Note: Pilchard Fishery, Cornwall Act 1776 (16 Geo. 3. c. 36)) for the Encouragement and Improvement of the Pilchard Fishery carried on within the Bay of Saint Ives in the County of Cornwall; and to make other Provisions in lieu thereof.
Burwell Drainage and Lodes Navigation Act 1841	4 & 5 Vict. c. lviii	21 June 1841
An Act for draining certain Fen Lands and Low Grounds in the Parish of Burwell in the County of Cambridge, and for improving the Navigation of the Lodes or Navigable Cuts passing through the same.
Edinburgh and Glasgow Union Canal and Cobbinshaw Reservoir Act 1841	4 & 5 Vict. c. lix	21 June 1841
An Act for amending the several Acts relating to the Edinburgh and Glasgow Union Canal, and for enlarging the Cobbinshaw Reservoir.
Deanhead Reservoir Act 1841 (repealed)	4 & 5 Vict. c. lx	21 June 1841
An Act to amend an Act of Her present Majesty (Note: Deanhead Reservoir Act 1838 (1 & 2 Vict. c. lxiv)) for making and maintaining a Reservoir at Deanhead in the Parish of Huddersfield in the West Riding of the County of York. (Repealed by Huddersfield Corporation Act 1913 (3 & 4 Geo. 5. c. xcv))
Wakefield Waterworks Company Act 1841 (repealed)	4 & 5 Vict. c. lxi	21 June 1841
An Act to enable the Wakefield Waterworks Company to raise a further Sum of Money. (Repealed by Wakefield Waterworks Act 1862 (25 & 26 Vict. c. xcix))
Birkenhead and Wirral Gas and Water Act 1841 (repealed)	4 & 5 Vict. c. lxii	21 June 1841
An Act for supplying Birkenhead and other Townships in the Hundred of Wirrall in the County of Chester with Gas; and for supplying Birkenhead aforesaid with Water. (Repealed by Birkenhead Corporation Act 1881 (44 & 45 Vict. c. cliii))
City of London and Tower Hamlets Cemetery Act 1841	4 & 5 Vict. c. lxiii	21 June 1841
An Act to establish a general Cemetery for the Interment of the Dead in the Parishes of Saint Dunstan Stepney and Saint Leonard Bromley in the County of Middlesex.
Dublin Streets Act 1841	4 & 5 Vict. c. lxiv	21 June 1841
An Act for further extending the Powers of several Acts for enabling the Commissioners of Wide Streets, Dublin, to widen and improve certain Ways, Streets, and Passages in the City and County of Dublin, and for raising Funds to enable the said Commissioners to carry the same into execution.
St. Pancras Streets Act 1841 (repealed)	4 & 5 Vict. c. lxv	21 June 1841
An Act to alter, amend, and enlarge some of the Powers and Provisions of the Acts for paving and otherwise improving certain Streets in the Parish of Saint Pancras in the County of Middlesex. (Repealed by London Government (Borough of St. Pancras) Order in Council 1901 (SR&O 1901/274))
Canterbury Improvement Act 1841 (repealed)	4 & 5 Vict. c. lxvi	21 June 1841
An Act for amending an Act passed in the Twenty-seventh Year of the Reign of King George the Third, (Note: Canterbury (Streets) Act 1787 (27 Geo. 3. c. 14)) for paving, cleansing, lighting, and watching the Streets and other public Passages and Places within the Walls of the City of Canterbury and the Liberties thereof, and other Places near the said City. (Repealed by Local Government Supplemental Act 1866 (29 & 30 Vict. c. 24))
Kentish Town Improvement Act 1841 (repealed)	4 & 5 Vict. c. lxvii	21 June 1841
An Act for paving, gravelling, lighting, cleansing, draining, and improving the Hamlet of Kentish Town and its Vicinity in the Parish of Saint Pancras in the County of Middlesex. (Repealed by London Government (Borough of St. Pancras) Order in Council 1901 (SR&O 1901/274))
Middlesbrough Improvement Act 1841 or the Middlesbrough Improvement and Market Act 1841	4 & 5 Vict. c. lxviii	21 June 1841
An Act for paving, lighting, watching, cleansing, and otherwise improving the Town of Middlesbrough and the Neighbourhood thereof in the North Riding of the County of York, and for establishing a Market therein.
Stamford Improvement Act 1841	4 & 5 Vict. c. lxix	21 June 1841
An Act for paving, cleansing, and otherwise improving the Town and Borough of Stamford in the Counties of Lincoln and Northampton.
Walton-on-the-Naze Improvement Act 1841 (repealed)	4 & 5 Vict. c. lxx	21 June 1841
An Act to authorize and provide for certain Improvements in the Town and Parish of Walton-le-Soken otherwise Walton-on-the-Naze in the County of Essex. (Repealed by Essex Act 1987 (c. xx))
Newcastle-upon-Tyne Improvement Act 1841	4 & 5 Vict. c. lxxi	21 June 1841
An Act to alter and extend an Act passed in the First Year of the Reign of Her present Majesty, intituled "An Act for regulating and improving the Borough of Newcastle-upon-Tyne." (Note: Newcastle-upon-Tyne Improvement Act 1837 (7 Will. 4 & 1 Vict. c. lxxii))
Kidderminster Poor Rates Act 1841 (repealed)	4 & 5 Vict. c. lxxii	21 June 1841
An Act for better assessing and collecting the Poor Rates in the Borough of Kidderminster in the County of Worcester. (Repealed by Statute Law (Repeals) Act 2008 (c. 12))
Exeter Small Debts Recovery Act 1841 (repealed)	4 & 5 Vict. c. lxxiii	21 June 1841
An Act for the more easy and speedy Recovery of Small Debts within the City and County of the City of Exeter. (Repealed by County Courts Act 1846 (9 & 10 Vict. c. 95))
Hatfield Court of Requests Act 1841 (repealed)	4 & 5 Vict. c. lxxiv	21 June 1841
An Act for extending the Jurisdiction of the Hatfield Court of Requests to certain Places in the West Riding of the County of York and in the Counties of Lincoln and Nottingham. (Repealed by County Courts Act 1846 (9 & 10 Vict. c. 95))
Kingsnorton Court of Requests Act 1841 (repealed)	4 & 5 Vict. c. lxxv	21 June 1841
An Act to extend the Jurisdiction of the Kingsnorton Court of Requests, and to amend the Act (Note: Kingsnorton and Northfield Small Debts Recovery Act 1840 (3 & 4 Vict. c. lxix)) relating thereto. (Repealed by County Courts Act 1846 (9 & 10 Vict. c. 95))
Launceston Small Debts Recovery Act 1841 (repealed)	4 & 5 Vict. c. lxxvi	21 June 1841
An Act for the more easy and speedy Recovery of Small Debts within the Town and Borough of Launceston and other Places in the Counties of Cornwall and Devon. (Repealed by County Courts Act 1846 (9 & 10 Vict. c. 95))
Blackburn Small Debts Recovery Act 1841 (repealed)	4 & 5 Vict. c. lxxvii	21 June 1841
An Act for the more easy and speedy Recovery of Small Debts within the Town of Blackburn and other Places in the County of Lancaster. (Repealed by County Courts Act 1846 (9 & 10 Vict. c. 95))
Wigan, Chorley and Ormskirk Small Debts Recovery Act 1841 (repealed)	4 & 5 Vict. c. lxxviii	21 June 1841
An Act for the more easy and speedy Recovery of Small Debts within the Town and Borough of Wigan and the Towns of Chorley and Ormskirk, and other Places therein mentioned, in the County Palatine of Lancaster. (Repealed by County Courts Act 1846 (9 & 10 Vict. c. 95))
Newark Small Debts Recovery Act 1841 (repealed)	4 & 5 Vict. c. lxxix	21 June 1841
An Act to amend an Act of Her present Majesty, for the more easy and speedy Recovery of Small Debts within the Borough of Newark and other Places in the Counties of Nottingham and Lincoln. (Repealed by County Courts Act 1846 (9 & 10 Vict. c. 95))
Totnes Small Debts Recovery Act 1841 (repealed)	4 & 5 Vict. c. lxxx	21 June 1841
An Act for the more easy and speedy Recovery of Small Debts within the Town of Totnes in the County of Devon, and other Places in the said County. (Repealed by County Courts Act 1846 (9 & 10 Vict. c. 95))
Staffordshire Potteries Small Debts Recovery Act 1841 (repealed)	4 & 5 Vict. c. lxxxi	21 June 1841
An Act for the more easy and speedy Recovery of Small Debts within and adjoining the District called The Staffordshire Potteries. (Repealed by County Courts Act 1846 (9 & 10 Vict. c. 95))
St. Helens and Prescot Small Debts Recovery Act 1841 (repealed)	4 & 5 Vict. c. lxxxii	21 June 1841
An Act for the more easy and speedy Recovery of Small Debts within the Towns of Saint Helens and Prescot, and Places adjacent, in the County Palatine of Lancaster. (Repealed by County Courts Act 1846 (9 & 10 Vict. c. 95))
Burnley and Colne Small Debts Recovery Act 1841 (repealed)	4 & 5 Vict. c. lxxxiii	21 June 1841
An Act for the more easy and speedy Recovery of Small Debts within the Towns of Burnley and Colne and Places adjacent in the County Palatine of Lancaster. (Repealed by County Courts Act 1846 (9 & 10 Vict. c. 95))
New Sarum Small Debts Recovery Act 1841 (repealed)	4 & 5 Vict. c. lxxxiv	21 June 1841
An Act for the more easy and speedy Recovery of Small Debts within the City and Borough of New Sarum and other Places in the Counties of Wilts, Bants, and Dorset. (Repealed by County Courts Act 1846 (9 & 10 Vict. c. 95))
New Sleaford Small Debts Recovery Act 1841 (repealed)	4 & 5 Vict. c. lxxxv	21 June 1841
An Act for the more easy and speedy Recovery of Small Debts within the Town of New Salford in the County of Lincoln, and other Places in the same County. (Repealed by County Courts Act 1846 (9 & 10 Vict. c. 95))
Gainsborough Small Debts Recovery Act 1841 (repealed)	4 & 5 Vict. c. lxxxvi	21 June 1841
An Act for the more easy and speedy Recovery of Small Debts within the Town of Gainsburgh in the County of Lincoln, and other Places in the Counties of Lincoln and Nottingham. (Repealed by County Courts Act 1846 (9 & 10 Vict. c. 95))
East Retford Small Debts Recovery Act 1841 (repealed)	4 & 5 Vict. c. lxxxvii	21 June 1841
An Act for the more easy and speedy Recovery of Small Debts within the Town or Borough of East Retford in the County of Nottingham, and other Places in the Counties of Nottingham, York, and Lincoln. (Repealed by County Courts Act 1846 (9 & 10 Vict. c. 95))
Meerbrook Sough Act 1841	4 & 5 Vict. c. lxxxviii	21 June 1841
An Act to incorporate the Proprietors of the Meerbrook Sough, and to enable them to levy and raise certain Royalties, Dues, and Tolls for the Continuation and Maintenance thereof.
Patent Rolling and Compressing Iron Company Act 1841	4 & 5 Vict. c. lxxxix	21 June 1841
An Act to enable "The Patent Rolling and Compressing Iron Company" to purchase certain Letters Patent, and to sue and be sued.
Rhymney Iron Company Act 1841	4 & 5 Vict. c. xc	21 June 1841
An Act for regulating legal Proceedings by or against "The Rhymney Iron Company," and for granting certain Powers thereto.
Stead's Patent Wooden Paving Company Act 1841	4 & 5 Vict. c. xci	21 June 1841
An Act for forming and establishing "Stead's Patent Wooden Paving Company," and to enable the said Company to purchase certain Letters Patent, and for confirming the same.
Church of England Life and Fire Assurance Trust and Annuity Company Act 1841	4 & 5 Vict. c. xcii	21 June 1841
An Act to enable the Church of England Life and fire Assurance, Trust, and Annuity Company to sue and be sued in the Name of the Managing Director or other Officer of the said Company.
Neptune Marine Insurance Company Act 1841	4 & 5 Vict. c. xciii	21 June 1841
An Act for regulating legal Proceedings by or against the Neptune Marine Insurance Company.
Imperial Life Insurance Company Act 1841 (repealed)	4 & 5 Vict. c. xciv	21 June 1841
An Act for enabling "The Imperial Life Insurance Company" to alter the Mode of Appropriation of Profits directed by their Deed of Settlement, and for regulating legal Proceedings by or against the Company. (Repealed by Imperial Life Insurance Company Act 1892 (55 & 56 Vict. c. ccxxx))
Hull Flax and Cotton Mill Company Act 1841	4 & 5 Vict. c. xcv	21 June 1841
An Act for regulating legal Proceedings by or against "The Hull Flax and Cotton Mill Company."
Scottish Marine Insurance Company Act 1841 (repealed)	4 & 5 Vict. c. xcvi	21 June 1841
An Act to enable the "Scottish Marine Insurance Company" to sue and be sued; and for other Purposes. (Repealed by Statute Law (Repeals) Act 1998 (c. 43))
Roxburgh and Dumfries Turnpike Roads Act 1841	4 & 5 Vict. c. xcvii	21 June 1841
An Act for more effectually widening and improving the Road from Wells to Highbridge, with a Road thereout to Cheddar all in the County of Somerset.
Wells, Highbridge and Cheddar Road Act 1841 (repealed)	4 & 5 Vict. c. xcviii	21 June 1841
An Act for further and more effectually repairing and maintaining certain Turnpike Roads in the Counties of Roxburgh and Dumfries. (Repealed by Annual Turnpike Acts Continuance Act 1869 (32 & 33 Vict. c. 90))
Bradford (Wiltshire) Roads and Stokeford Bridge Act 1841	4 & 5 Vict. c. xcix	21 June 1841
An Act for more effectually repairing and maintaining several Roads leading to and from the Town of Bradford in the County of Wilts, and for maintaining a Bridge over the River Avon at Stokeford in the said County.
Henley-upon-Thames, Dorchester and Oxford Road Act 1841 (repealed)	4 & 5 Vict. c. c	21 June 1841
An Act for repairing the Roads leading from Henley-upon-Thames to Culham Bridge, and to the Chancellor's Milestone near Magdalen Bridge, in the County of Oxford. (Repealed by Statute Law (Repeals) Act 2013 (c. 2))
Blakedown Pool and Birmingham Road Act 1841	4 & 5 Vict. c. ci	21 June 1841
An Act for repairing the Road from Blakedown Pool in the Parish of Hagley in the County of Worcester into the Borough of Birmingham in the County of Warwick.
Barnstaple and Braunton Turnpike Road Act 1841	4 & 5 Vict. c. cii	21 June 1841
An Act for repairing the Turnpike Road from Barnstaple to Braunton in the County of Devon, and for making certain new Lines of Road to communicate with the same.
Sedgley Roads (Staffordshire) Act 1841	4 & 5 Vict. c. ciii	21 June 1841
An Act for repairing and improving the Roads commonly called the Sedgley Roads in the County of Stafford, and for making a new Line of Road connected therewith in the said County.
Dewsbury and Leeds Road Act 1841	4 & 5 Vict. c. civ	21 June 1841
An Act for repairing the Road from Dewsbury to Leeds in the West Riding of the County of York, and for making and repairing a new Line of Road leading therefrom.
Brighton, Shoreham and Lancing Road and Adur Bridge Act 1841	4 & 5 Vict. c. cv	21 June 1841
An Act to amend an Act passed in the Eleventh Year of the Reign of King George the Fourth, (Note: Brighton, Shoreham and Lancing Road and New Shoreham Bridge Act 1830 (11 Geo. 4 & 1 Will. 4. c. lxiii)) for repairing and improving the Road from Brighton to Shoreham and Lancing in the County of Sussex, and for other Purposes connected therewith.
Selby and Leeds Road Act 1841	4 & 5 Vict. c. cvi	21 June 1841
An Act for repairing and improving the Road from Selby to Leeds in the West Riding of the County of York.
Nuffield and Faringdon Road Act 1841 (repealed)	4 & 5 Vict. c. cvii	21 June 1841
An Act for repairing, improving, and maintaining the Road from a Place in the Parish of Nuffield in the County of Oxford, through Wallingford and Wantage, to Faringdon in the County of Berks. (Repealed by Statute Law (Repeals) Act 2013 (c. 2))
Lincoln Roads Act 1841	4 & 5 Vict. c. cviii	21 June 1841
An Act for more effectually repairing, maintaining, and improving certain Roads leading to and from the City of Lincoln.
Tinsley and Doncaster Turnpike Road Act 1841	4 & 5 Vict. c. cix	21 June 1841
An Act for repairing the Turnpike Road from Tinsley to Doncaster, and for making certain new Lines of Road to communicate with the same, all in the West Riding of the County of York.
Cripps Corner and Gills Green Road Act 1841	4 & 5 Vict. c. cx	21 June 1841
An Act for making and maintaining a Turnpike Road from Cripps Corner in the Parish of Ewhurst in the County of Sussex to Gills Green in the Parish of Hawkhurst in the County of Kent.
Abingdon and Chilton Pond Road Act 1841 (repealed)	4 & 5 Vict. c. cxi	22 June 1841
An Act for repairing and maintaining the Road from the Mayors Stone in Abingdon to Chilton Pond in the County of Berks. (Repealed by Annual Turnpike Acts Continuance Act 1869 (32 & 33 Vict. c. 90) and Statute Law (Repeals) Act 2013 (c. 2))
Blackburn Improvements, Town Hall and Markets Act 1841 (repealed)	4 & 5 Vict. c. cxii	22 June 1841
An Act for improving the Streets and public Places, and erecting a Town Hall and improving the Markets, in the Township of Blackburn in the County Palatine of Lancaster. (Repealed by Blackburn Improvement Act 1847 (10 & 11 Vict. c. cclv))
Bourne Drainage Act 1841	4 & 5 Vict. c. cxiii	22 June 1841
An Act for the better Drainage of Lands in Bourn North Fen and Dyke Fen in the Manor and Parish of Bourn in the County of Lincoln.
Birkenhead and West Kirby Turnpike Road Act 1841	4 & 5 Vict. c. cxiv	22 June 1841
An Act for maintaining and repairing, as Turnpike, a certain Road commencing at or near the North-west Gate of the Woodside Hotel Stable-yard in the Township or Chapelry of Birkenhead, and terminating at or near the Cottage of Henry Berry in the Township of Little Meols in the Parish of West Kirby in the County of Chester, and for levying Tolls for that Purpose.

=== Private acts ===
Short title	Citation	Royal assent
Long title
Southorpe Inclosure Act 1841	4 & 5 Vict. c. 1 Pr.	30 March 1841
An Act for inclosing Lands in the Parish of Barnack with Pilsgate and Southorpe in the County of Northampton.
Collyweston Inclosure Act 1841	4 & 5 Vict. c. 2 Pr.	30 March 1841
An Act for inclosing Lands in the Parish of Collyweston, and within the Precincts of West Hay, in the County of Northampton.
Eccleshill (Yorkshire) Inclosure Act 1841	4 & 5 Vict. c. 3 Pr.	10 May 1841
An Act for inclosing Lands in the Manor of Eccleshill in the Pariah of Bradford in the West Riding of the County of York.
Bury Inclosure Act 1841	4 & 5 Vict. c. 4 Pr.	18 May 1841
An Act for inclosing Lands in the Parish of Bury in the County of Sussex.
Eccleshall (Staffordshire) Inclosure Act 1841	4 & 5 Vict. c. 5 Pr.	18 May 1841
An Act for inclosing Lands in the Parish of Eccleshall in the County of Stafford.
Gamlingay Inclosure Act 1841	4 & 5 Vict. c. 6 Pr.	18 May 1841
An Act for inclosing Lands in the Parish of Gamlingay in the County of Cambridge.
Waningore Inclosure Act 1841	4 & 5 Vict. c. 7 Pr.	18 May 1841
An Act for inclosing Lands in the Manor of Waningore in the County of Sussex.
Uplyme Inclosure Act 1841	4 & 5 Vict. c. 8 Pr.	18 May 1841
An Act for inclosing Lands in the Parish of Uplyme in the County of Devon.
Division of Winwick Rectory (Lancashire) Act 1841	4 & 5 Vict. c. 9 Pr.	18 May 1841
An Act for the Division of the Rectory of Winwich in the County Palatine of Lancaster.
Bedingham Inclosure Act 1841	4 & 5 Vict. c. 10 Pr.	21 June 1841
An Act for inclosing Lands in the Parish of Bedingham in the County of Norfolk.
Upper Heyford Inclosure Act 1841	4 & 5 Vict. c. 11 Pr.	21 June 1841
An Act for inclosing Lands in the Parish of Upper Heyford in the County of Oxford.
Cheveley Inclosure Act 1841	4 & 5 Vict. c. 12 Pr.	21 June 1841
An Act for inclosing Lands in the Parish of Cheveley in the County of Cambridge.
Whittlesea St. Mary and Whittlesea St. Andrew (Cambridgeshire) Inclosure Act 1841	4 & 5 Vict. c. 13 Pr.	21 June 1841
An Act to amend an Act of the last Session of Parliament for inclosing Lands in the Parishes of Whittlesea Saint Mary and Whittlesea Saint Andrew in the County of Cambridge.
Marsh Gibbon Inclosure Act 1841	4 & 5 Vict. c. 14 Pr.	21 June 1841
An Act for inclosing Lands in the Parish of Marsh Gibbon in the County of Buckingham.
Elsing Inclosure Act 1841	4 & 5 Vict. c. 15 Pr.	21 June 1841
An Act for dividing, allotting, and inclosing Lands in the Parish of Elsing in the County of Norfolk.
Leverington, &c. Inclosure Act 1841	4 & 5 Vict. c. 16 Pr.	21 June 1841
An Act for inclosing the Commons, Droves, Banks, and Waste Lands in the Parishes of Leverington, Tid Saint Giles, and Outwell, in the Isle of Ely in the County of Cambridge.
Olveston Inclosure Act 1841	4 & 5 Vict. c. 17 Pr.	21 June 1841
An Act for inclosing Lands in the Manor and Tithing of Olveston within the Parish of Olveston in the County of Gloucester.
Brimington Inclosure Act 1841	4 & 5 Vict. c. 18 Pr.	21 June 1841
An Act for inclosing the Commons and Waste Lands in the Township and Manor of Brimington in the County of Derby.
Coundon Inclosure Act 1841	4 & 5 Vict. c. 19 Pr.	21 June 1841
An Act for dividing, allotting, and inclosing the Commons and Waste Lands lying within the Hamlet of Coundon in the County of Warwick, and the Hamlet of Keresley in the County of Warwick and County of the City of Coventry, or one of them.
Whitmore Inclosure Act 1841	4 & 5 Vict. c. 20 Pr.	21 June 1841
An Act for inclosing Lands in the Parish of Whitmore in the County of Stafford.
Abingdon Inclosure Act 1841	4 & 5 Vict. c. 21 Pr.	21 June 1841
An Act for inclosing and improving Lands in the Parishes of Saint Helen and Saint Nicholas, Abingdon, in the County of Berks.
Great Horwood Inclosure Act 1841	4 & 5 Vict. c. 22 Pr.	21 June 1841
An Act for inclosing Lands in the Parish of Great Horwood in the County of Buckingham.
Whaddon Chase Inclosure Act 1841	4 & 5 Vict. c. 23 Pr.	21 June 1841
An Act for setting out and allotting certain Portions of the Lands in Whaddon Chase in the County of Buckingham in lieu of the Common Rights upon the said Chase, and for extinguishing such Common Rights.
Clent Vicarage Act 1841	4 & 5 Vict. c. 24 Pr.	21 June 1841
An Act for severing the Chapelry of Rowley Regis from the Vicarage of Clent in the County of Stafford; and for the Sale of certain Lands situate in the Parish of Rowley Regis, and belonging to the Vicarage of Clent with the Chapelry of Rowley Regis annexed, and thereby providing a Residence and Maintenance for the Curate or Officiating Minister of Rowley Regis; and for other Purposes.
Dean and Chapter of Westminster Estate Act 1841	4 & 5 Vict. c. 25 Pr.	21 June 1841
An Act to empower the Dean and Chapter of Westminster to grant Building Leases in certain Parts of the City of Westminster; and for other Purposes.
Smyth's Estate Act 1841	4 & 5 Vict. c. 26 Pr.	21 June 1841
An Act to confirm to Sir Edward Bowyer Smyth Baronet the Advowson of District Churches within the Parish of Saint Giles, Camberwell, in the County of Surrey.
Whitaker's Estate Act 1841	4 & 5 Vict. c. 27 Pr.	21 June 1841
An Act for vesting certain Real Estate devised by the Will of Thomas Whittaker Esquire, deceased, in Trustees, upon Trust to be sold, and for laying out the Money arising therefrom in the Purchase of other Estates, to be settled to the same Uses.
Jackson's Estate Act 1841	4 & 5 Vict. c. 28 Pr.	21 June 1841
An Act for extending the Powers of the Trustees under the Settlement on the Marriage of the Reverend James Jackson with Miss Eliza Houlton.
Whitehouse's (or Williams's) Estate Act 1841	4 & 5 Vict. c. 29 Pr.	21 June 1841
An Act for empowering the Trustees of Henry Bickerton Whitehouse and Mary his Wife, and of the Children of the said Mary Whitehouse, to lease or sell the Mines and Minerals in and under and to lease Part of the Surface of a certain Freehold Estate called the Hill Top Farm, situate in the Parish of West-bromwich in the County of Stafford, and also to sell the Estate.
Wemyss's Estate Act 1841	4 & 5 Vict. c. 30 Pr.	21 June 1841
An Act for vesting the Lands and Barony of Lundin and the Lands of Aithernie, and certain other Heritages, in favour of James Erskine Wemyss Esquire, and his Heirs and Assigns, in Fee Simple, on Condition of certain Parts of the Lands and Barony of Methill, and other Lands, being settled in lieu thereof in Fee Tail.
Clay's Estate Act 1841	4 & 5 Vict. c. 31 Pr.	21 June 1841
An Act to authorize the granting of Leases and Conveyances for Mining Purposes of Estates at Northwingfield in the County of Derby i the Property of Frederick Lord Clay and his infant Son Richard Clay.
Heathcote's Estate Act 1841	4 & 5 Vict. c. 32 Pr.	21 June 1841
An Act for vesting certain Estates situate in the County of Leicester, devised by the Will of Catherine Moyer Spinster, in Trustees, upon Trust to convey the same in Exchange for certain other Estates situate in the same County.
Hay Newton's Estate Act 1841	4 & 5 Vict. c. 33 Pr.	21 June 1841
An Act for selling a Part of the Entailed Estate of Newton in the County of Haddington, and applying the Price towards discharging Part of the Debts incurred in improving the sad Entailed Estate; and also for exchanging certain Parts of the Entailed Estate for Lands held in Fee Simple.
Warriner's Estate Act 1841	4 & 5 Vict. c. 34 Pr.	21 June 1841
An Act to amend "An Act for vesting Estates of which Gifford Warriner Esquire, a Lunatic, is Tenant in Tail, in Trustees for Sale, and also for effecting a Partition of certain Parts thereof, and for granting Leases;" and to enable the said Trustees to make Conveyances in Fee, subject to Rent-charges, and Leases for long Terms of Years, at reserved Rents, of the unsold Portions of the said Estates, and to make Sale of the Rent-charges and of the Reversions in Fee expectant on the Leases. (Note: Gifford Warriner's Estate Act 1830 (11 Geo. 4 & 1 Will. 4. c. 41 Pr.))
Stone's Estate Act 1841	4 & 5 Vict. c. 35 Pr.	21 June 1841
An Act for carrying into effect a Contract between Edward Gresley Stone and John Attwood Esquires for the Sale of the Coptfold Hall Estate in the County of Essex to the said John Attwood, and for investing the Purchase Money in other Estates, to be settled to the same Uses; and also for authorizing the Exchange of certain Lands and Hereditaments in the Counties of Worcester and Gloucester, devised by the Will of John Stone Esquire, deceased.
Westwood's Estate Act 1841	4 & 5 Vict. c. 36 Pr.	21 June 1841
An Act for authorizing Leases to be granted of the Burross Estate in the Parish of Kingswinford in the County of Stafford, devised by the Will of Thomas Westwood deceased to Thomas Westwood during his Life, and after his Decease upon the Trusts of such Will.
Lord Glammis's Estate Act 1841	4 & 5 Vict. c. 37 Pr.	21 June 1841
An Act to enable the Trustees of the Trust Estates in Scotland of John Bowes Lyon, late Earl of Strathmore and Kinghorn, deceased, to advance and pay certain yearly Sums on behalf of Thomas George Lyon Bowes commonly called Lord Glamis, his Grand-nephew, who in certain Events will become entitled to the Trust Estates in question.
Saint John's Hospital (Winchester) Estate Act 1841	4 & 5 Vict. c. 38 Pr.	21 June 1841
An Act to enable the Trustees of the Hospital of Saint John the Baptist in the City of Winchester to effect an Exchange with Sir Edmund Antrobus Baronet, under the Authority of the Court of Chancery.
Dutton's Estate Act 1841	4 & 5 Vict. c. 39 Pr.	21 June 1841
An Act to enable the Trustees of the Will of the late Peter Dutton Esquire to make Sale of Part of the Estates devised by the same Will, and to lay out the Money arising from any such Sale in the Purchase of other Estates, to be settled to the subsisting Uses of the said Will, and to make Conveyances in Fee, or Demises for long Terms of Years, of other Part of the said Estates, for the Purpose of building on and otherwise improving the same; and also to apply a Sum of Money arising from the Sale of Part of the Estates devised by the said Will in carrying the aforesaid Objects and Purposes into execution.
Abington Glebe Act 1841	4 & 5 Vict. c. 40 Pr.	21 June 1841
An Act for ascertaining and defining the Glebe Land of the Rector of Abington alias Abingdon in the County of Northampton, and for building a Parsonage House for such Rector.
Fishmongers' Company Estate Act 1841	4 & 5 Vict. c. 41 Pr.	21 June 1841
An Act for effecting a Sale and Conveyance from the Feoffees or Trustees of the Parish of Saint Mildred Bread Street in the City of London to the Fishmongers Company, and for investing the Purchase Money in other Estates, to be settled to the same Uses.
Marshall's Estate Act 1841	4 & 5 Vict. c. 42 Pr.	21 June 1841
An Act to amend an Act passed in the Second and Third Years of the Reign of Her present Majesty, intituled "An Act to authorize the Sale of certain Lands, Tenements, and Hereditaments in the Counties of Kent and Northampton, formerly belonging to William Marshall of Clifford's Inn in the City of London, Gentleman, deceased, and for other Purposes incidental thereto." (Note: William Marshall's Estate Act 1839 (2 & 3 Vict. c. 35 Pr.))
Yarmouth Children's Hospital Estate Act 1841	4 & 5 Vict. c. 43 Pr.	21 June 1841
An Act for effecting an Exchange between the Mayor, Aldermen, and Burgesses of the Borough of Great Yarmouth in the County of Norfolk and the Trustees of a Charity in the said Borough called "The Children's Hospital."
Emerson's Estate Act 1841	4 & 5 Vict. c. 44 Pr.	21 June 1841
An Act for enlarging the Power to grant Leases contained in the Will of Alexander Lyon Emerson Doctor of Medicine, deceased; and for other Purposes.
Oldbury Charity Estate Act 1841	4 & 5 Vict. c. 45 Pr.	21 June 1841
An Act to enable the Trustees of the Oldbury Charity to grant Building Leases.
Blackburn Town's Moor Act 1841	4 & 5 Vict. c. 46 Pr.	22 June 1841
An Act for vesting in the Overseers of the Poor of the Township of Blackburn in the County Palatine of Lancaster Parts of the Towns Moor, for Sale or other Disposal thereof.
Smethwick Chapelry Estate Act 1841	4 & 5 Vict. c. 47 Pr.	22 June 1841
An Act to enable the Trustees of the Chapelry of Smethwick in the County of Stafford to demise Coal and other Mines, and to grant Building Leases.
Bolckrow's Naturalization Act 1841 (Note: This act was not printed by the Queen's Printer)	4 & 5 Vict. c. 48 Pr.	30 March 1841
An Act for naturalizing Henry William Ferdinand Bolckow.
Heyn's Naturalization Act 1841	4 & 5 Vict. c. 49 Pr.	30 March 1841
An Act for naturalizing Gustavus Heyn.
Bogdan's Naturalization Act 1841	4 & 5 Vict. c. 50 Pr.	6 April 1841
An Act for naturalizing Frederick Salomo Bogdan.
Dovenby and Papcastle Inclosure Act 1841	4 & 5 Vict. c. 51 Pr.	10 May 1841
An Act for inclosing Lands in the Townships or Divisions of Dovenby and Papcastle in the Parish of Bridekirk in the County of Cumberland.
Burgett's Naturalization Act 1841	4 & 5 Vict. c. 52 Pr.	10 May 1841
An Act for naturalizing Charles Christopher Burgett.
Shawe's Divorce Act 1841	4 & 5 Vict. c. 53 Pr.	21 June 1841
An Act to dissolve the Marriage of Nathaniel Bogle French Shawe Esquire with Charlotte Shawe his now Wife, and to enable him to many again; and for other Purposes therein mentioned.
Larkins's Divorce Act 1841	4 & 5 Vict. c. 54 Pr.	21 June 1841
An Act to dissolve the Marriage of John Pascal Larkins Attorney at Law with Eliza Bird his now Wife, and to enable him to marry again; and for other Purposes therein mentioned.
Goring's Divorce Act 1841	4 & 5 Vict. c. 55 Pr.	21 June 1841
An Act to dissolve the Marriage of Harry Bent Goring Esquire with Augusta his now Wife, and to enable him to marry again; and for other Purposes therein mentioned.
Wyatt's Divorce Act 1841	4 & 5 Vict. c. 56 Pr.	21 June 1841
An Act to dissolve the Marriage of Thomas Wyatt Enquire with Elizabeth Greg his now Wife, and to enable him to marry again; and for other Purposes therein mentioned.
Hall's Divorce Act 1841	4 & 5 Vict. c. 57 Pr.	21 June 1841
An Act to dissolve the Marriage of John Hall Esquire with Jemima Caroline his now Wife, and to enable him to marry again; and for other Purposes.
Giordano's Naturalization Act 1841	4 & 5 Vict. c. 58 Pr.	21 June 1841
An Act for naturalizing Marzio Francois Giordano.
Passavants' Naturalization Act 1841	4 & 5 Vict. c. 59 Pr.	21 June 1841
An Act for naturalizing Philipp Jacob Passavant, and Philipp Johann Passavant, Theodor Passavant, Mary Magdalen Johanna Passavant, Jacob Rudolph Passavant, and Henrietta Mariane Laura Louisa Augusta Passavant, his Children.

=== Sources ===
- A Collection of the Public General Statutes passed in the Fourth and Fifth Year of the Reign of Her Majesty Queen Victoria, 1841. London: Eyre & Spottiswoode. 1841 – via Google Books.
- The Statutes of the United Kingdom of Great Britain and Ireland, 4 & 5 Victoria and 5 Victoria, 1841. His Majesty's statute and law printers. 1841 – via Internet Archive.
- A Collection of the Public General Statutes passed in the Fourth and Fifth Year of the Reign of Her Majesty Queen Victoria, 1841. London: Eyre & Spottiswoode. 1841 – via Internet Archive.
- Journals of the House of Commons (PDF). Vol. 96 – via parliament.uk.

== 5 Vict. ==
The first session of the 14th Parliament of the United Kingdom, which met from 19 August 1841 until 7 October 1841.

There were no local acts passed in this session.

=== Public general acts ===
Short title	Citation	Royal assent
Long title
Crown Lands Act 1841 (repealed)	5 Vict. c. 1	5 October 1841
An Act to authorize Her Majesty's Commissioners of Woods to grant Building Leases of the Royal Kitchen Garden at Kensington, and to form and improve other Royal Gardens; and to enable the said Commissioners to purchase Lands of Copyhold or Customary Tenure. (Repealed by Crown Estate Act 1961 (9 & 10 Eliz. 2. c. 55))
Frogmore House Act 1841	5 Vict. c. 2	5 October 1841
An Act for annexing the Mansion House, Gardens, and Grounds at Frogmore, Part of the Land Revenue of the Crown, to Windsor Castle.
Navy Pay Act 1841 (repealed)	5 Vict. c. 3	5 October 1841
An Act to alter an Act of the Eleventh Year of King George the Fourth, (Note: Pay of the Navy Act 1830 (11 Geo. 4 & 1 Will. 4. c. 20)) for amending the Laws relating to the Pay of the Royal Navy, and an Act of the Fifth Year of King William the Fourth, (Note: Navy Pay Act 1834 (4 & 5 Will. 4. c. 25)) to alter the Provisions of the said Act. (Repealed by Admiralty, &c. Acts Repeal Act 1865 (28 & 29 Vict. c. 112))
Care, etc., of Lunatics Act 1841 (repealed)	5 Vict. c. 4	5 October 1841
An Act to continue for Three Years, and from thence to the End of the then next Session of Parliament, Two Acts relating to the Care and Treatment of Insane Persons in England. (Repealed by Lunacy Act 1845 (8 & 9 Vict. c. 100))
Court of Chancery Act 1841 or the Administration of Justice Act 1841 (repealed)	5 Vict. c. 5	5 October 1841
An Act to make further Provisions for the Administration of Justice. (Repealed by Supreme Court Officers (Retirement, Pensions, &c.) Act 1921 (11 & 12 Geo. 5. c. 56), Public Records Act 1958 (6 & 7 Eliz. 2. c. 51) and Rules of the Supreme Court (Revision) 1965 (SI 1965/1776))
Bishops in Foreign Countries Act 1841	5 Vict. c. 6	5 October 1841
An Act to amend an Act made in the Twenty-sixth Year of the Reign of His Majesty King George the Third, intituled "An Act to empower the Archbishop of Canterbury or the Archbishop of York for the Time being to consecrate to the Office of a Bishop Persons being Subjects or Citizens of Countries out of His Majesty's Dominions." (Note: Consecration of Bishops Abroad Act 1786 (26 Geo. 3. c. 84))
Extended Law Continuance Act 1841 (repealed)	5 Vict. c. 7	5 October 1841
An Act to continue until the Thirty-first Day of July One thousand eight hundred and forty-two such Laws as may expire within a limited Period. (Repealed by Statute Law Revision Act 1874 (No. 2) (37 & 38 Vict. c. 96))
National Debt Act 1841 (repealed)	5 Vict. c. 8	7 October 1841
An Act for funding Exchequer Bills, and for making Provision for the Service of the Year One thousand eight hundred and forty-one. (Repealed by Statute Law Revision Act 1870 (33 & 34 Vict. c. 69))
Census Act 1841 (repealed)	5 Vict. c. 9	7 October 1841
An Act to provide for Payment of the Persons employed in taking Account of the Population in England. (Repealed by Statute Law Revision Act 1874 (No. 2) (37 & 38 Vict. c. 96))
Poor Law Commission Act 1841 or the Poor Law Amendment Act 1841 (repealed)	5 Vict. c. 10	7 October 1841
An Act to continue the Poor Law Commission until the Thirty-first Day of July One thousand eight hundred and forty-two. (Repealed by Statute Law Revision Act 1874 (No. 2) (37 & 38 Vict. c. 96))
Appropriation Act 1841 (repealed)	5 Vict. c. 11	7 October 1841
An Act for raising the Sum of Ten millions six hundred and twenty-six thousand three hundred and fifty Pounds by Exchequer Bills, for the Service of the Year One thousand eight hundred and forty-one, and for appropriating the Supplies granted in this Session of Parliament. (Repealed by Statute Law Revision Act 1874 (No. 2) (37 & 38 Vict. c. 96))

=== Private acts ===
Short title	Citation	Royal assent
Long title
Riddell's Estate Act 1841	5 Vict. c. 1 Pr.	5 October 1841
An Act to vest the Entailed Estate of Ardnamurchan and Sunart, in the County of Argyle, in Trustees, for the Purpose of raising Money for the Payment of the Debts affecting the said Estate, and of certain Sums expended by Sir James Milks Riddell in improving the same, and for the Erection of a Mansion House and Offices thereon.
Duke of Marlborough's Estate Act 1841	5 Vict. c. 2 Pr.	5 October 1841
An Act for enabling the Most Noble George Duke of Marlborough to charge, for the Repairs of Blenheim Palace, certain Hereditaments devised by the Will of the Most Noble George Third Duke of Marlborough, deceased, as a collateral Security with a Sum of Twenty-five thousand Pounds and Interest, and as a primary Security with a further Sum not exceeding Ten thousand Pounds and Interest.
Earl of Scarbrough's Indemnity Act 1841 (Note: This act was not printed by the Queen's Printer)	5 Vict. c. 3 Pr.	8 September 1841
An Act to relieve the Right Honourable John Savile Lumley Savile Earl of Scarbrough from certain Disabilities and Penalties in consequence of his having sat and voted in the House of Peers without being duly qualified by taking and subscribing the Oaths and Declaration prescribed by Law.
Clayton's Name Act 1841	5 Vict. c. 4 Pr.	5 October 1841
An Act to enable George Alan Clayton to take and bear the Name and Arms of Lowndes.

=== Sources ===
- A Collection of the Public General Statutes passed in the Fourth and Fifth Year of the Reign of Her Majesty Queen Victoria, 1841. London: Eyre & Spottiswoode. 1841 – via Google Books.
- The Statutes of the United Kingdom of Great Britain and Ireland, 4 & 5 Victoria and 5 Victoria, 1841. His Majesty's statute and law printers. 1841 – via Internet Archive.
- A Collection of the Public General Statutes passed in the Fourth and Fifth Year of the Reign of Her Majesty Queen Victoria, 1841. London: Eyre & Spottiswoode. 1841 – via Internet Archive.
- Journals of the House of Commons (PDF). Vol. 96 – via parliament.uk.

== See also ==
- List of acts of the Parliament of the United Kingdom
