= Vaccination Act =

UK Acts of Parliament, 1840 to 1907

The UK Vaccination Acts of 1840, 1853, 1867 and 1898 were a series of legislative Acts passed by the Parliament of the United Kingdom regarding the vaccination policy of the country.

== Provisions ==
=== The 1840 act ===
Vaccination Act 1840
- Act of Parliament
- Parliament of the United Kingdom
- Long title: An Act to extend the Practice of Vaccination.
- Citation: 3 & 4 Vict. c. 29
- Territorial extent: England and Wales; Ireland; (Note: Sections 1 and 6.)

Dates
- Royal assent: 23 July 1840
- Commencement: 23 July 1840 (Note: Section 1.)
- Repealed: England and Wales: 1 January 1868; Ireland: 11 August 1875
Other legislation
Amended by	Vaccination Act 1841; Vaccination Act 1853; Vaccination Acts Amendment Act 1861
Repealed by	England and Wales: Vaccination Act 1867; Ireland: Statute Law Revision Act 1875

Status: Repealed

Text of statute as originally enacted

The Vaccination Act 1840 (3 & 4 Vict. c. 29):

- Made variolation illegal.
- Provided optional vaccination free of charge.

In general, the disadvantages of variolation are the same as those of vaccination, but added to them is the general agreement that variolation was always more dangerous than vaccination.

Vaccination Act 1841
- Act of Parliament
- Parliament of the United Kingdom
- Long title: An Act to amend an Act to extend the Practice of Vaccination.
- Citation: 4 & 5 Vict. c. 32
- Territorial extent: England and Wales; Ireland

Dates
- Royal assent: 21 June 1841
- Commencement: 21 June 1841 (Note: The Acts of Parliament (Commencement) Act 1793.)
- Repealed: England and Wales: 1 January 1868; Ireland: 11 August 1875
Other legislation
Amends	Vaccination Act 1840
Amended by	Vaccination Act 1853; Vaccination Acts Amendment Act 1861
Repealed by	England and Wales: Vaccination Act 1867; Ireland: Statute Law Revision Act 1875

Status: Repealed

Text of statute as originally enacted

The 1840 act was amended by the Vaccination Act 1841 (4 & 5 Vict. c. 32).

=== The 1853 act ===
Vaccination Act 1853
- Act of Parliament
- Parliament of the United Kingdom
- Long title: An Act further to extend and make compulsory the Practice of Vaccination.
- Citation: 16 & 17 Vict. c. 100
- Territorial extent: England and Wales

Dates
- Royal assent: 20 August 1853
- Commencement: 20 August 1853
- Repealed: 1 January 1868
Other legislation
Amends	Vaccination Act 1840; Vaccination Act 1841
Amended by	Vaccination Acts Amendment Act 1861
Repealed by	Vaccination Act 1867

Status: Repealed

Text of statute as originally enacted

By the Vaccination Act 1853 (16 & 17 Vict. c. 100) it was required:

- That every child, whose health permits, shall be vaccinated within three, or in case of orphanage within four months of birth, by the public vaccinator of the district, or by some other medical practitioner.
- That notice of this requirement, and information as to the local arrangements for public vaccination, shall, whenever a birth is registered, be given by the registrar of births to the parents or guardians of the child.
- That every medical practitioner who, whether in public or private practice, successfully vaccinates a child shall send to the local registrar of births a certificate that he has done so; and the registrar shall keep a minute of all the notices given, and an account of all the certificates thus received.
- That parents or guardians who, without sufficient reason, after having duly received the registrar's notice of the requirement of Vaccination, either omit to have a child duly vaccinated, or, this being done, omit to have it inspected as to the results of vaccination, shall be liable to a penalty of £1; and all penalties shall be recoverable under the Summary Jurisdiction Act 1848 (11 & 12 Vict. c. 43) and shall be paid toward the local poor-rate.

=== The 1861 act ===
Vaccination Acts Amendment Act 1861
- Act of Parliament
- Parliament of the United Kingdom
- Long title: An Act to facilitate Proceedings before Justices under the Acts relating to Vaccination.
- Citation: 24 & 25 Vict. c. 59
- Territorial extent: United Kingdom

Dates
- Royal assent: 1 August 1861
- Commencement: 1 August 1861
- Repealed: England and Wales: 1 January 1868; Ireland: 11 August 1875
Other legislation
Amends	Vaccination Act 1840
Repealed by	England and Wales: Vaccination Act 1867; Ireland: Statute Law Revision Act 1875

Status: Repealed

Text of statute as originally enacted

The Vaccination Acts were amended by the Vaccination Acts Amendment Act 1861 (24 & 25 Vict. c. 59).

=== The 1867 act ===
The Vaccination Act 1867 (30 & 31 Vict. c. 84) consolidated and updated the existing laws relating to vaccination, and was repealed by the National Health Service Act 1946 (9 & 10 Geo. 6. c. 81).

The poor-law guardians were to control vaccination districts formed out of the parishes, and pay vaccinators from 1s to 3s per child vaccinated in the district (the amount paid varied with how far they had to travel).

Within seven days of the birth of a child being registered, the registrar was to deliver a notice of vaccination; if the child was not presented to be vaccinated within three months, or brought for inspection afterwards, the parents or guardians were liable to a summary conviction and fine of 20s.

The act also provided that any person who produced or attempted to inoculate another with smallpox could be imprisoned for a month.

=== The 1871 act ===
Vaccination Act 1871
- Act of Parliament
- Parliament of the United Kingdom
- Long title: An Act to amend the Vaccination Act, 1867.
- Citation: 34 & 35 Vict. c. 98
- Territorial extent: United Kingdom

Dates
- Royal assent: 21 August 1871
- Commencement: 1 January 1872 (Note: Section 2.)
- Repealed: 5 July 1948
Other legislation
Amends	Vaccination Act 1867
Amended by	Vaccination Act 1874; Statute Law Revision Act 1883; Vaccination Act 1898
Repealed by	National Health Service Act 1946

Status: Repealed

Text of statute as originally enacted

In 1871 another act, the Vaccination Act 1871 (34 & 35 Vict. c. 98) was passed appointing a Vaccination Officer, also authorising a defendant to appear in a court of law by any member of his family, or any other person authorised by him. This act also confirmed the principle of compulsion, which evidently sparked hostility and opposition to the practice.

=== The 1874 act ===
Vaccination Act 1874
- Act of Parliament
- Parliament of the United Kingdom
- Long title: An Act to explain the Vaccination Act, 1871.
- Citation: 37 & 38 Vict. c. 75
- Territorial extent: United Kingdom

Dates
- Royal assent: 7 August 1874
- Commencement: 7 August 1874
- Repealed: 5 July 1948
Other legislation
Amends	Vaccination Act 1871
Repealed by	National Health Service Act 1946
Relates to	Vaccination Act 1871

Status: Repealed

Text of statute as originally enacted

The Vaccination Act 1874 (37 & 38 Vict. c. 75) clarified the role of the Local Government Board in making regulations for guardians to implement the 1871 act.

An Act to explain the Vaccination Act, 1871.
[7th August 1874.]

Whereas by section five of the Vaccination Act, 1871, it is enacted, amongst other things, that, subject to the provisions of that Act, the Local Government Board shall have the same powers with respect to guardians and vaccination officers in matters relating to vaccination as they have with respect to guardians and officers of guardians in matters relating to the relief of the poor, and may make rules, orders, and regulations accordingly:

And whereas doubts are entertained whether the Local Government Board are empowered under the said Act to make rules, orders, and regulations with respect to the proceedings to be taken by the guardians or their officers for the enforcement of the provisions of the Vaccination Acts, 1867 and 1871:

Be it therefore enacted by the Queen's most Excellent Majesty, by and with the advice and consent of the Lords Spiritual and Temporal, and Commons, in this present Parliament assembled, and by the authority of the same, as follows:

1. The powers conferred by the said recited section shall be deemed to extend to and include the making of rules, orders, and regulations prescribing the duties of guardians and their officers in relation to the institution and conduct of the proceedings to be taken for enforcing the provisions of the said Acts, and the payment of the costs and expenses relating thereto, and rules, orders, and regulations under this Act shall be deemed to be made under the said section.
2. This Act may be cited as The Vaccination Act, 1874.

=== The 1889 royal commission ===
A royal commission was established in 1889, which issued six reports between 1892 and 1896. Its recommendations, including the abolition of cumulative penalties and the use of safer vaccine, were incorporated into the Vaccination Act 1898.

=== The 1898 and 1907 acts ===
Vaccination Act 1898 (Note: Section 10(3).)
- Act of Parliament
- Parliament of the United Kingdom
- Long title: An Act to Amend the Law with respect to Vaccination.
- Citation: 61 & 62 Vict. c. 49
- Territorial extent: England and Wales (Note: Section 10(1).)

Dates
- Royal assent: 12 August 1898
- Commencement: 1 January 1899 (Note: Section 10(2).)
- Repealed: 5 July 1948
Other legislation
Amends	Vaccination Act 1867; Vaccination Act 1871
Amended by	Vaccination Act 1907
Repealed by	National Health Service Act 1946

Status: Repealed

Text of statute as originally enacted

Vaccination Act 1907 (Note: Section 3(2).)
- Act of Parliament
- Parliament of the United Kingdom
- Long title: An Act to substitute a Statutory Declaration for the Certificate required under section two of the Vaccination Act, 1898, of Conscientious Objection.
- Citation: 7 Edw. 7. c. 31
- Territorial extent: United Kingdom

Dates
- Royal assent: 28 August 1907
- Commencement: 1 January 1908 (Note: Section 3(1).)
- Repealed: 5 July 1948
Other legislation
Amends	Vaccination Act 1898
Repealed by	National Health Service Act 1946
Relates to	Vaccination (Scotland) Act 1907

Status: Repealed

Text of statute as originally enacted

Vaccination (Scotland) Act 1907
- Act of Parliament
- Parliament of the United Kingdom
- Long title: An Act to amend the Law with respect to Vaccination in Scotland by authorising a statutory declaration of conscientious objection.
- Citation: 7 Edw. 7. c. 49
- Territorial extent: Scotland

Dates
- Royal assent: 28 August 1907
- Commencement: 28 August 1907
- Repealed: 5 July 1948
Other legislation
Amends	Vaccination (Scotland) Act 1863
Repealed by	National Health Service (Scotland) Act 1947
Relates to	Vaccination Act 1907

Status: Repealed

Text of statute as originally enacted

In 1898 a new vaccination law was passed, in some respects modifying, but not superseding, previous acts, giving conditional exemption of conscientious objectors, (and substituting calf lymph for humanised lymph). It removed cumulative penalties and introduced a conscience clause, allowing parents who did not believe vaccination was efficacious or safe to obtain a certificate of exemption.

The Vaccination Act 1898 (61 & 62 Vict. c. 49) purported to give liberty of non-vaccination, but this liberty was not really obtained. Parents applying for a certificate of exemption had to satisfy two magistrates, or one stipendiary, of their conscientious objections. Some stipendiaries, and many of the magistrates, refused to be satisfied, and imposed delays. Unless the exemption was obtained before the child was four months old, it was too late. The consequence was that in the year 1906, only about 40,000 exemptions were obtained in England and Wales. In the year 1907 the government recognised that the magistrates had practically declined to carry out the law of 1898, and consequently two new laws, the Vaccination Act 1907 (7 Edw. 7. c. 31) for England and Wales, and the Vaccination (Scotland) Act 1907 (7 Edw. 7. c. 49) for Scotland, were passed. Under this law the parent escaped penalties for the non-vaccination of his child if within four months from the birth he made a statutory declaration that he confidently believed that vaccination would be prejudicial to the health of the child, and within seven days thereafter delivered, or sent by post, the declaration to the Vaccination Officer of the district.

It is the duty of all Magistrates to sign a Statutory Declaration when asked to do so, and the Magistrate's Clerk is entitled to a fee of 1s. Most of the liberal-minded magistrates will witness the Declaration at their own house, or any other convenient place. Some, however, refuse to do that except in the law court. A Statutory Declaration may also be witnessed by a Commissioner for Oaths, and some other officials.
