= Vaccination Act 1867 =

Act of the Parliament of the United Kingdom

Vaccination Act 1867 (Note: Section 37.)
- Act of Parliament
- Parliament of the United Kingdom
- Long title: An Act to consolidate and amend the Laws relating to Vaccination.
- Citation: 30 & 31 Vict. c. 84
- Territorial extent: England and Wales (Note: Section 14.)

Dates
- Royal assent: 12 August 1867
- Commencement: 1 January 1868
- Repealed: 5 July 1948 (Note: The "appointed day" under section 79(1) of the National Health Service Act 1946, fixed by Order in Council.)
Other legislation
Amends	See § Repealed enactments
Repeals/revokes	See § Repealed enactments
Amended by	Vaccination Act 1871; Vaccination Act 1874; Vaccination Act 1898; Vaccination Act 1907
Repealed by	National Health Service Act 1946

Status: Repealed

Text of statute as originally enacted

The Vaccination Act 1867 (30 & 31 Vict.. c. 84) was an act of the Parliament of the United Kingdom that consolidated enactments related to compulsory smallpox vaccination in England and Wales.

== Provisions ==
=== Repealed enactments ===
Section 1 of the act repealed 6 enactments, listed in that section. The repeal did not affect the divisions and districts of unions and parishes previously made, or any contracts under the repealed statutes then in force, or any acts and proceedings duly commenced under those statutes and not then completed, or any liabilities and responsibilities incurred under them, all of which remained in as full force as if the statutes had not been repealed, unless inconsistent with the provisions of the act.

Citation	Short title	Description	Extent of repeal
3 & 4 Vict. c. 29	Vaccination Act 1840	An Act to extend the Practice of Vaccination.	The whole act.
4 & 5 Vict. c. 32	Vaccination Act 1841	An Act to amend an Act to extend the Practice of Vaccination.	The whole act.
16 & 17 Vict. c. 100	Vaccination Act 1853	An Act further to extend and make compulsory the Practice of Vaccination.	The whole act.
21 & 22 Vict. c. 25	Births and Deaths Registration Act 1858	An Act to amend the Act concerning Non-parochial Registers, and the Acts for Marriages, and for registering Births, Deaths, and Marriages, in England, and concerning Vaccination.	Section 7.
21 & 22 Vict. c. 97	Public Health Act 1858	An Act for vesting in the Privy Council certain Powers for the Protection of the Public Health.	Section 2.
24 & 25 Vict. c. 59	Vaccination Acts Amendment Act 1861	An Act to facilitate Proceedings before Justices under the Acts relating to Vaccination.	The whole act.

== Subsequent developments ==
The act was substantially amended by later legislation, including the Vaccination Act 1871 (34 & 35 Vict. c. 98), the Vaccination Act 1874 (37 & 38 Vict. c. 75), the Vaccination Act 1898 (61 & 62 Vict. c. 49), which introduced a conscience clause allowing parents to obtain exemption from vaccination, and the Vaccination Act 1907 (7 Edw. 7. c. 31). The whole act was repealed by section 76 of, and part II of the tenth schedule to, the National Health Service Act 1946 (9 & 10 Geo. 6. c. 81), which came into force on 5 July 1948.
