= Deanhead Reservoir =

Reservoir in West Yorkshire, England

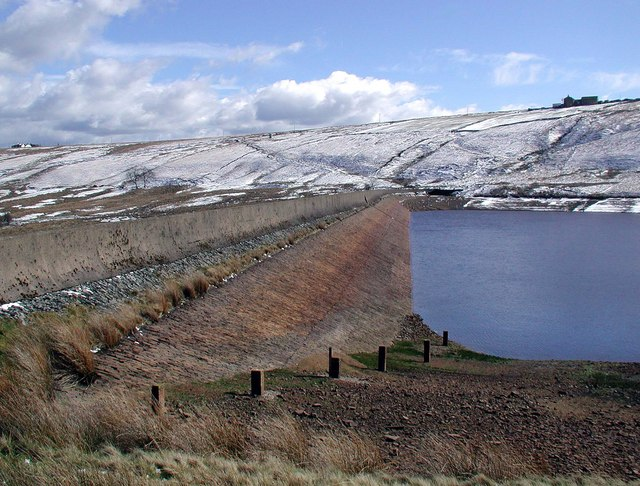

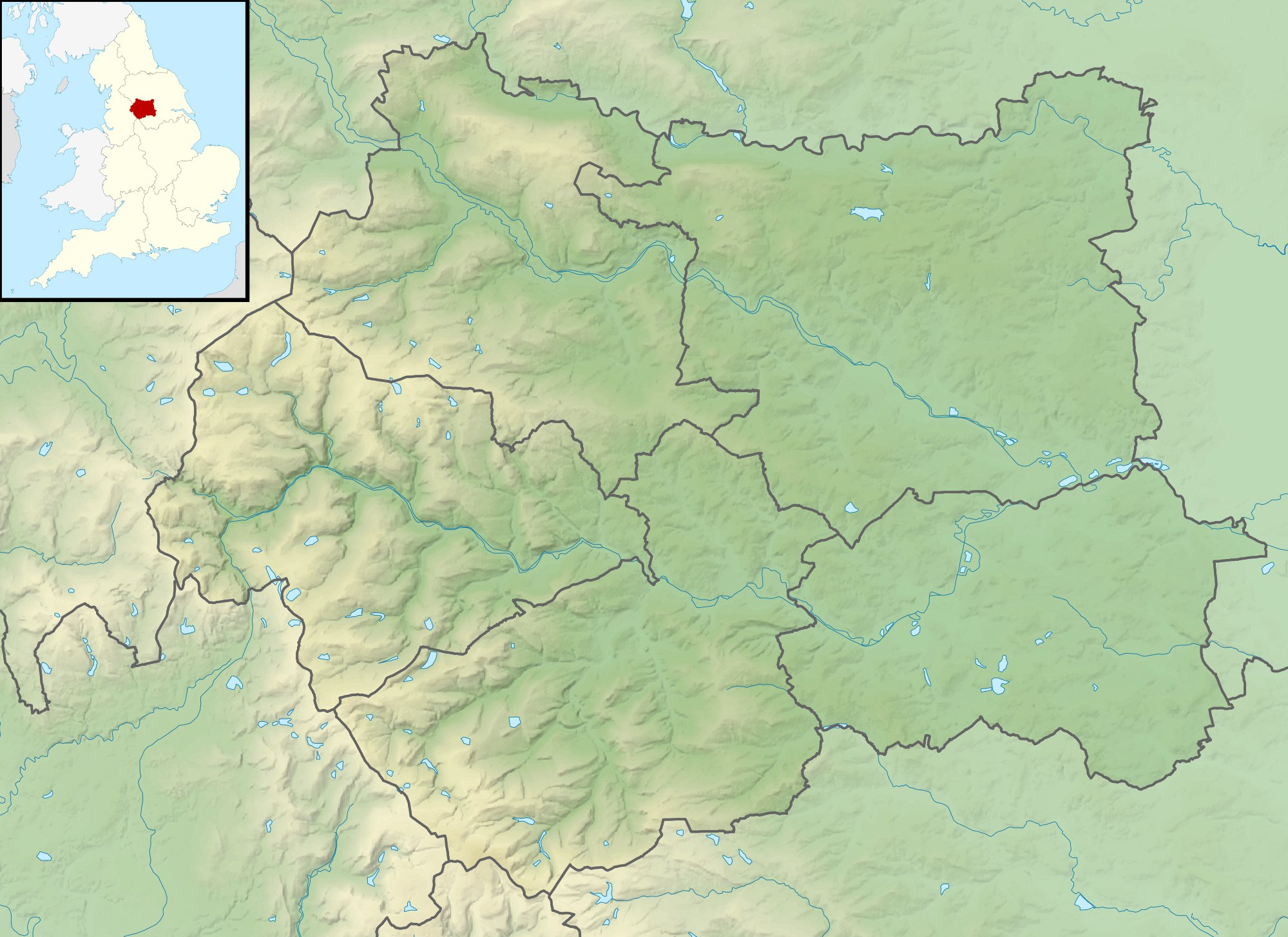
- Location within West Yorkshire
- Location: Kirklees, West Yorkshire
- Coordinates: 53°37′58″N 1°56′39″W
- Lake type: reservoir
- Basin countries: United Kingdom
- Surface area: 6.7 hectares (17 acres)
- Surface elevation: 988 feet (301 m)

Deanhead Reservoir Act 1838
- Act of Parliament
- Parliament of the United Kingdom
- Long title: An Act for making and maintaining a Reservoir at Deanhead in the Parish of Huddersfield in the West Riding of the County of York, and for other Purposes relating thereto.
- Citation: 1 & 2 Vict. c. lxiv

Dates
- Royal assent: 4 July 1838

Other legislation
- Repealed by: Huddersfield Corporation Act 1913

Status: Repealed

Text of statute as originally enacted

Deanhead Commissioners Act 1889
- Act of Parliament
- Parliament of the United Kingdom
- Long title: An Act to empower the Commissioners of the Deanhead Reservoir to execute Works and supply Water in bulk and for other purposes.
- Citation: 52 & 53 Vict. c. xxi

Dates
- Royal assent: 31 May 1889

Other legislation
- Repealed by: Huddersfield Corporation Act 1913

Status: Repealed

Text of statute as originally enacted

Deanhead Reservoir is a reservoir near Scammonden, in the metropolitan district of Kirklees, West Yorkshire, England.

It is named after Dean Head, a village that was mostly submerged during construction of the dam. Construction started in 1838 and it opened a year later, almost 140 years before Scammonden Reservoir (its downstream neighbour) was opened in 1971. Water flowing out of Deanhead forms Black Burne Brook which now feeds into Scammonden Water. Deanhead reservoir was originally constructed to supply water to the factories in the Blackburn Valley that was downstream of the reservoir. During the 1995 drought, the outlines of foundations of buildings in the village were visible.

Deanhead also is the name of a Pennine pass to the south of the reservoir, which carries the A640 from Huddersfield to Denshaw, following the course of a Roman road.
