= Court of Chancery of the County Palatine of Durham and Sadberge =

English court

The Court of Chancery of the County Palatine of Durham and Sadberge was a court of chancery that exercised jurisdiction within the County Palatine of Durham (including the wapentake of Sadberge) until it was merged into the High Court in 1972.

== Constitution ==
Even before the Norman Conquest the Bishops of Durham appear to have claimed palatinate or quasi-palatinate rights and jurisdiction. This prescriptive franchise was confirmed by charters of William the Conqueror, William Rufus, Henry I and Henry II. In the reign of Edward I, Anthony Bek, the then Bishop was summoned to appear before the King's Justices under the Statute of Quo Warranto (18 Edw. 1) to show how he held his franchise, and on his refusal to appear his franchise was seized into the King's hands in the name of distress. The Bishop appealed to the King and his council in Parliament, who held that he was entitled to jura regalia between Tyne and Tees, and in Norhamshire and Bedlington. In 1836 the jura regalia of the Bishop of Durham were transferred to the Crown by the Durham (County Palatine) Act 1836 (6 & 7 Will. 4. c. 19). (Note: The jurisdiction of the Chancery Court and the Court of Pleas were not altered by this Act. The jurisdiction of the Court of Pleas was transferred to the High Court by the Judicature Act 1873 (36 & 37 Vict. c. 66), s 16.) The last one surviving was the Court of Chancery of the County Palatine of Durham, the exercise of the jurisdiction being assimilated to that of the High Court of Justice by the Palatine Court of Durham Act 1889 (52 & 53 Vict. c. 47)

== Jurisdiction ==
The jurisdiction of the court was unlimited in amount, but limited in area to the county palatine which, as of 1909, certainly included the whole of what was then the county of Durham, and possibly other districts. The Durham (County Palatine) Act 1836 (6 & 7 Will. 4. c. 19), defined "county of Durham" as "including the detached parts of Craikshire, Bedlingtonshire, Norhamshire, Allertonshire, and Islandshire, and all other places heretofore within the jurisdiction of the Bishop of Durham, in right of the said county palatine." By 1909 it had not been decided what the effect upon this was of the enactment of the Counties (Detached Parts) Act 1844 (7 & 8 Vict. c. 61), annexing detached parts of counties to the county of which it formed part for the purposes of parliamentary elections. The First Edition of Halsbury's Laws of England, however, suggested that an Act of this nature would not affect the jura regalia without express enactment. The Palatine Court of Durham Act 1889 (52 & 53 Vict. c. 47) did not define the area over which the court had jurisdiction.

The jurisdiction apart from statute was the old jurisdiction of the High Court of Chancery within the county palatine. This was a jurisdiction in personam over the person within the area of jurisdiction, extending, in effect, to property wherever situate, but enforceable only, apart from statute, against the person, and not the property. This jurisdiction was supplemented by statutes enabling orders of the Palatine Court to be enforced by making them orders of the High Court of Justice, empowering the court to deal with the property of infants and other persons under disability, the administration of assets, (Note: The powers conferred on the court by this enactment were under the following statutes: Real property of infants: The Debts Recovery Act 1830 (11 Geo. 4. & 1 Will. 4. c. 47), s 11; the Infants' Property Act 1830 (11 Geo. 4. & 1 Will. 4. c. 65), ss 16 & 17; the Debts Recovery Act 1839 (2 & 3 Vict. c 60); the Land Drainage Act 1845 (8 & 9 Vict. c. 56), ss 3 to 5; the Partition Act 1868 (31 & 32 Vict. c. 40), s 3 (see, however, s 6 of the Partition Act 1876 (39 & 40 Vict. c. 17), s 6); the Settled Estates Act 1877 (40 & 41 Vict. c 18), ss 4, 10 & 49; the Conveyancing and Law of Property Act 1881 (44 & 45 Vict. c. 41), ss 41 & 42; and the Settled Land Act 1882 (45 & 46 Vict. c 38), ss 59 & 60.; Personal property of infants: The Legacy Duty Act 1796 (36 Geo. 3. c. 52), s 32; and the Trustee Act 1893 (56 & 57 Vict. c. 53), ss 26 & 28.; Marriage settlements of infants: The Infant Settlements Act 1855 (18 & 19 Vict. c. 43).; Maintenance of infants: The Infants' Property Act 1830 (11 Geo. 4. & 1 Will. 4. c. 65), s 32.; Property of felons: The Forfeiture Act 1870 (33 & 34 Vict. c. 23), s 28.; Investment of moneys of persons under disability: The Copyhold Acts 1841, 1843 and 1852 (4 & 5 Vict. c. 35, s 73; 6 & 7 Vict. c. 23, s 14; 15 & 16 Vict. c. 51, ss 22 & 39), which were repealed and contained in the Copyhold Act 1894 (57 & 58 Vict. c. 46); the Defence Acts 1842 and 1860 (5 & 6 Vict. c. 94, s 25; 23 & 24 Vict. c. 112, s 20); the Ecclesiastical Houses of Residence Act 1842 (5 & 6 Vict. c. 26); the Housing of the Working Classes Act 1890 (53 & 54 Vict. c. 70), s 20 & Sch, r 20; the Lands Clauses Consolidation Act 1845 (8 & 9 Vict. c. 18), s 69.; Administration of assets: Judicature Act 1873 (36 & 37 Vict. c. 66), ss 16 & 34; the Judicature Act 1875 (38 & 39 Vict. c. 77), s 10; the Bankruptcy Act 1883 (46 & 47 Vict. c. 52), s 125.) giving to it the summary jurisdiction of the High Court, (Note: The powers conferred on the court by this section were under the following statutes: The Cestui que vie Act 1707 (6 Ann. c. 72), s 1; the Law of Property Amendment Acts 1859 and 1860 (22 & 23 Vict. c. 35; 23 & 24 Vict. c. 38); the Marriage Act 1823 (4 Geo. 4. c. 72), s 17; the Custody of Infants Act 1873 (36 & 37 Vict. c 12), s 1; the Guardianship of Infants Act 1886 (49 & 50 Vict. c. 27); the Companies Acts 1862 and 1867 (25 & 26 Vict. c. 89; 30 & 31 Vict. c. 131), subsequently the Companies (Consolidation) Act 1908 (8 Edw. 7. c. 69); the Mortgage Debenture Acts 1865 and 1870 (28 & 29 Vict. c. 78; 33 & 34 Vict. c. 20); the Railway Companies Act 1867 (30 & 31 Vict. c. 127); the Life Assurance Companies Acts 1870 to 1872 (33 & 34 Vict. c. 61; 34 & 35 Vict. c 58; 35 & 36 Vict. c 41); the Land Clauses Consolidation Acts 1845 and 1860 (8 & 9 Vict. c. 18, 23 & 24 Vict. c. 106); the Public Money Drainage Act 1846 (9 & 10 Vict. c. 101); the Improvement of Land Act 1864 (27 & 28 Vict. c 114), s 21; the Fines and Recoveries Act 1833 (3 & 4 Will. 4. c 74), s 48; the Declaration of Title Act 1862 (25 & 26 Vict. c. 67); the Land Registry Act 1862 (25 & 26 Vict. c. 53); the Judgments Act 1864 (27 & 28 Vict. c. 112); the Vendor and Purchaser Act 1874 (37 & 38 Vict. c. 78), s 9; the Married Women's Property Act 1882 (45 & 46 Vict. c. 75), ss 10 & 17; the Land Tax Redemption Act 1802 (42 Geo. 3. c. 116); the Local Loans Act 1875 (38 & 39 Vict. c. 83); the Customs Consolidation Act 1876 (39 & 40 Vict. c. 36), s 45; the Arbitration Act 1889 (52 & 53 Vict. c. 49)) and the High Court jurisdiction under the Charitable Trusts Acts 1853 to 1869, and also the jurisdiction under the Partition Acts 1868 and 1876, the Settled Estates Act 1877 (40 & 41 Vict. c. 18), the Conveyancing Act 1881 (44 & 45 Vict. c. 41), and the Settled Land Acts 1882 and 1884. There was also jurisdiction under section 46 of the Trustee Act 1893 (56 & 57 Vict. c. 53), and section 2 of the Judicial Trustee Act 1896 (59 & 60 Vict. c. 35). The jurisdiction was concurrent with that of the High Court of Justice.

Transfer of jurisdiction

Nothing contained in section 1 of the Durham (County Palatine) Act 1836 prejudiced or affected the jurisdiction of this court.

== Judge ==
The Chancellor of the County Palatine of Durham was the sole judge of the court. He was appointed by warrant under the royal sign manual.

== Procedure ==
The Chancellor had a prescriptive power to regulate the procedure of his court, and further, with the concurrence of the Lord Chancellor, power to adapt and modify the Rules of the Supreme Court to the Palatine Court. The Chancellor had jurisdiction to hear interlocutory matters out of the jurisdiction. In case of any person who had entered an appearance, or come in, or otherwise submitted to the jurisdiction of the court, the Chancellor could, upon special application, make an order for service of process on him out of the jurisdiction. The service of subpoenas on witnesses out of the jurisdiction was valid.

Rules

(A) "Orders to be observed in the Chancery at Durham" were General Orders dated 8 October 1596 (38 Eliz 1). (B) "Orders for the better expedition, and more perfect and exact proceedings in the Suits in the Chancery, at Durham" were General Orders dated 1610, signed by W Duresme and Richard Hutton, and done at the Chancery of Durham "Fra. Goodrick, Canc". (C) "Orders revived, and established in the Court of Chancery, at Durham, in open Court" were General Orders dated 29 August 1676 (28 Car 2) and signed by Jo Otway. (D) "Orders relating to the Practice not, or but few of them, in the preceding Tables, but ordered by the Court to be observed" were General Orders dated 22 October 1684 (36 Car 2).

General Orders and Rules of the Court of Chancery at Durham were made by the Chancellor on 15 June 1853. He also made an order appointing George Walker to print an publish these Rules and Orders, whereupon they were printed and published by Walker.

The Chancery of Durham Rules 1889 were made by the Chancellor on 1 February 1889, and were amended by rules made on 6 July 1889. An order as to court fees and another as to solicitor's costs were also made by the Chancellor on 1 February 1889. These rules, which were adapted from the Rules of the Supreme Court, were printed and put on sale. They were made under the Chancellor's prescriptive power, and not under the powers conferred by section 1 of the Palatine Court of Durham Act 1889.

In 1952, the Chancery of Durham Rules 1889 were accused by a working party of the Committee on Supreme Court Practice and Procedure of being archaic and difficult, if not impossible, for practitioners to obtain for use in their own offices.

Appeal

There was an appeal to the Court of Appeal, and thence to the House of Lords.

== Officers ==
Up to at least 1909, there was an Attorney General, a Solicitor General, a conveyancing counsel, and a registrar of the court, who was appointed by the Chancellor and exercised the functions of a Master of the Supreme Court (Chancery Division and Taxing Office) and of a Chancery Registrar etc. He also had the custody of documents etc. There was an appeal from the Registrar to the Chancellor.

Cursitor

The office of cursitor of chancery in the palatine of Durham was abolished by section 1 of the Durham Chancery Act 1869 (32 & 33 Vict c 84), which transferred the duties of that office to the registrar of the court.

== Other relevant legislation ==
The court was regulated by, in particular, the Palatine Court of Durham Act 1889 (52 & 53 Vict c 47). That Act was repealed by section 56 of, and Schedule 11 to, the Courts Act 1971.

Evidence of foreign law

See sections 4(2) and 4(4)(a) and (b) of the Civil Evidence Act 1972.

Reciprocal enforcement of foreign judgments

See article 2(1)(a) of the Convention set out in the Schedule to the Reciprocal Enforcement of Foreign Judgments (Israel) Order 1971 (S.I. 1971/1039).

See article 2(1)(a) of the Convention set out in the Schedule to the Reciprocal Enforcement of Foreign Judgments (the Netherlands) Order 1969 (S.I. 1969/1063)

See article 2(1)(a) of the Convention set out in the Schedule to the Reciprocal Enforcement of Foreign Judgments (Norway) Order 1962 (S.I. 1962/636)

Power to authorise superior landlord to enter and execute works

See section 30(3) of the Housing, Town Planning, &c. Act 1919.

Power of court to authorise examination of works on unfit premises or for improvement

See section 164(3) of the Housing Act 1957.

Land Charges Act 1925

See section 20(2) of that Act.

== Merger with the High Court ==
The Courts Act 1971 states: "On the appointed day ... the Court of Chancery of the County Palatine of Durham and Sadberge ... shall be merged with the High Court. Accordingly on and after that day no jurisdiction, whether conferred by statute or otherwise, could be exercised, or can now be exercised, by the Palatine Courts as such." The Court of Chancery of the County Palatine of Durham and Sadberge was abolished on merger with the High Court.

=== Transitional provisions ===
Transitional provisions were contained in Part I of Schedule 5 to the Courts Act 1971.

=== Offices ===
Any judicial or other office in the Court of Chancery of the County Palatine of Durham and Sadberge was abolished by section 44(1)(b) of the Courts Act 1971.

Section 44(2) conferred a power to make regulations to provide for the compensation of persons who suffered loss of employment or loss or diminution of emoluments attributable to the effect of section 44(1)(b) or to the merger of the Court of Chancery of the County Palatine of Durham and Sadberge.

== See also ==
- Court of equity
- Courts of the County Palatine of Durham
