= Palatine Court of Durham Act 1889 =

Act of the Parliament of the United Kingdom

Palatine Court of Durham Act 1889 (Note: Section 12.)
- Act of Parliament
- Parliament of the United Kingdom
- Long title: An Act to amend the Practice and Proceedings of the Court of Chancery of the county palatine of Durham.
- Citation: 52 & 53 Vict. c. 47
- Territorial extent: United Kingdom

Dates
- Royal assent: 26 August 1889
- Commencement: 26 August 1889 (Note: The Acts of Parliament (Commencement) Act 1793.)
- Repealed: 1 January 1972
Other legislation
Amended by	Trustee Act 1893; Statute Law Revision Act 1908; Settled Land Act 1925; Supreme Court of Judicature (Consolidation) Act 1925; Statute Law Revision Act 1950; Charities Act 1960
Repealed by	Courts Act 1971

Status: Repealed

Text of statute as originally enacted

The Palatine Court of Durham Act 1889 (52 & 53 Vict. c. 47) was an act of the Parliament of the United Kingdom. It was one of the Durham County Palatine Acts 1836 to 1889. The bill for the act was the Palatine Court of Durham Bill.

== Commentary ==
Lely said that the act was of practical utility.

Lapsley said that the principal change introduced by the act was the provision, in section 11, that appeals should in future lie to the Court of Appeal and thence to the House of Lords, and that no appeal from any order or judgement of the chancellor of Durham should be taken directly to the House of Lords.

== Subsequent developments ==
Section 8 of the act was repealed by section 51 of, and the schedule to, the Trustee Act 1893 (56 & 57 Vict. c. 53).

The following enactments were repealed by section 1 of, and the schedule to, the Statute Law Revision Act 1908 (8 Edw. 7. c. 49), which came into force on 21 December 1908.

- The preamble to the act
- In section 1 of the act, the word "High" where it occurred before the word "Chancellor", and the words "of Great Britain"
- In section 9 of the act, the word "High" where it occurred before the word "Chancellor", and the words "of Great Britain"
- In section 10 of the act, the word "High" where it occurred before the word "Chancellor", and the words "of Great Britain"
- In section 11 of the act, the words "after the passing of this Act"

The words "The Settled Land Act, 1882, and the Settled Land Act, 1884" in section 10 of the act were repealed by section 119(1) of, and the fifth schedule to, the Settled Land Act 1925 (15 & 16 Geo. 5. c. 18), which came into force on 1 January 1926.

In section 11 of the act, to the words "for the time being and", was repealed by section 226(1) of, and schedule 6 to, the Supreme Court of Judicature (Consolidation) Act 1925, which came into force on 1 January 1926.

In section 10 of the act, to the words "judge thereof", was repealed by section 1(1) of, and the first schedule to, the Statute Law Revision Act 1950 (14 Geo. 6. c. 6), which came into force on 23 May 1950.

Section 9 of the act was repealed by section 48(2) of, and part I of the seventh schedule to, the Charities Act 1960 (8 & 9 Eliz. 2. c 58), which came into force on 1 January 1961.

The whole act was repealed by section 56(4) of, and part II of schedule 11 to, the Courts Act 1971, which came into force on 1 January 1972.

== Bibliography ==
- John Bruce Williamson. The Palatine Court of Durham Act, 1889. Beavis Stewart & Co. 1890. ["Bruce Williamson on Palatine Court"]
- "The Palatine Court of Durham Act, 1889". Halsbury's Statutes of England. First Edition. Butterworth & Co (Publishers) Ltd. Bell Yard, Temple Bar, London. 1929. Volume 4: . Page 129 et seq. See also preliminary note.
- Halsbury's Statutes of England. Second Edition. Butterworth & Co (Publishers) Ltd. Bell Yard, Temple Bar, London. 1948. Volume 5. Page 303 et seq. See also pages 153, 191, 219, 226 to 230, 237, 273, 308 and 348.
- Halsbury's Statutes of England. Third Edition. Butterworths. London. 1969. Volume 7. Page 539 et seq.
- William Hanbury Aggs. "Palatine Court of Durham Act 1889". Chitty's Statutes of Practical Utility. Sixth Edition. Sweet and Maxwell. Stevens and Sons. Chancery Lane, London. 1913. Volume 7. Title "Local Courts". Page 739. Listed in General Index. See also volume 13 at page 160.
- The Statutes: Second Revised Edition. 1909. Volume 17: . Page 621.
- The Statutes Revised. Third Edition. 1950.
- The Public General Acts passed in the fifty-second and fifty-third years of Her Majesty Queen Victoria. HMSO. London. 1889. Pages 191 to 196.
- "The Law and the Lawyers" (1889) 87 The Law Times 413. See also pages 303 and 325.
- "Current Topics" (1890) 34 Solicitors Journal 595
- (1889) 24 The Law Journal 388
- Odgers and Odgers. The Common Law of England. Second Edition. Sweet & Maxwell. 1920. Volume 2. Pages 1020 and 1024.
- Robert Campbell. Principles of English Law. Stevens and Sons. 1907. Page 444. Google Books.
- Robert Schless. Courts Emergency Powers Practice. Being the Courts Emergency Powers Part. Hamish Hamilton (Law Books) Ltd. Great Russell Street, London. 1944. Page 13. Google Books.
- (1913) 73 Monthly Notices of the Royal Astronomical Society 203
