= Philip Arthur Ashworth =

British lawyer, barrister, and jurist

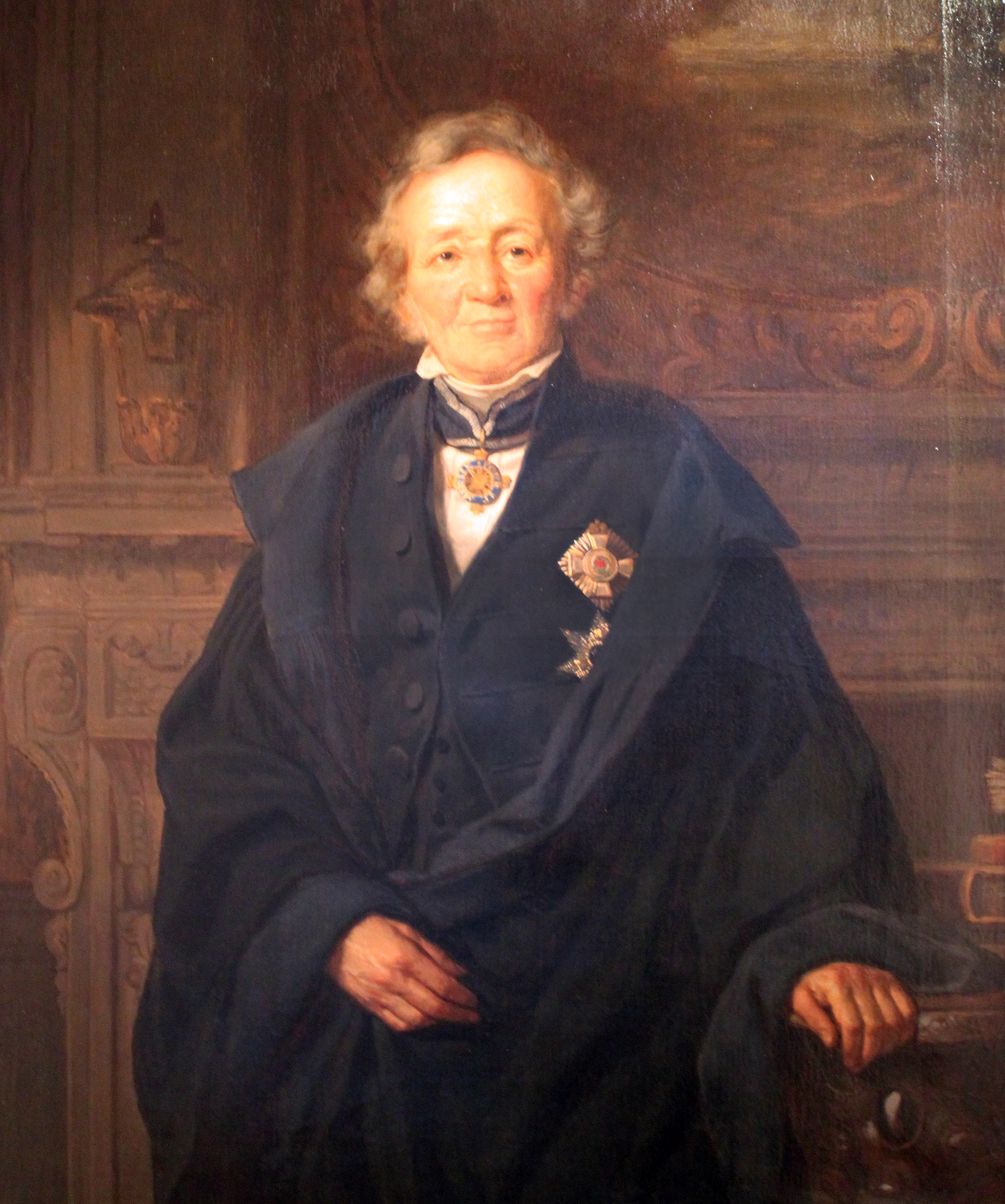
Philip Arthur Ashworth, 1875 portrait

Philip Arthur Ashworth (1853–1921), was a British international lawyer, barrister and jurist. He was the author, editor and translator of numerous works covering legal, constitutional, historic and military topics, and a leading authority on European jurisprudence and the Constitution of the United Kingdom and British colonies.

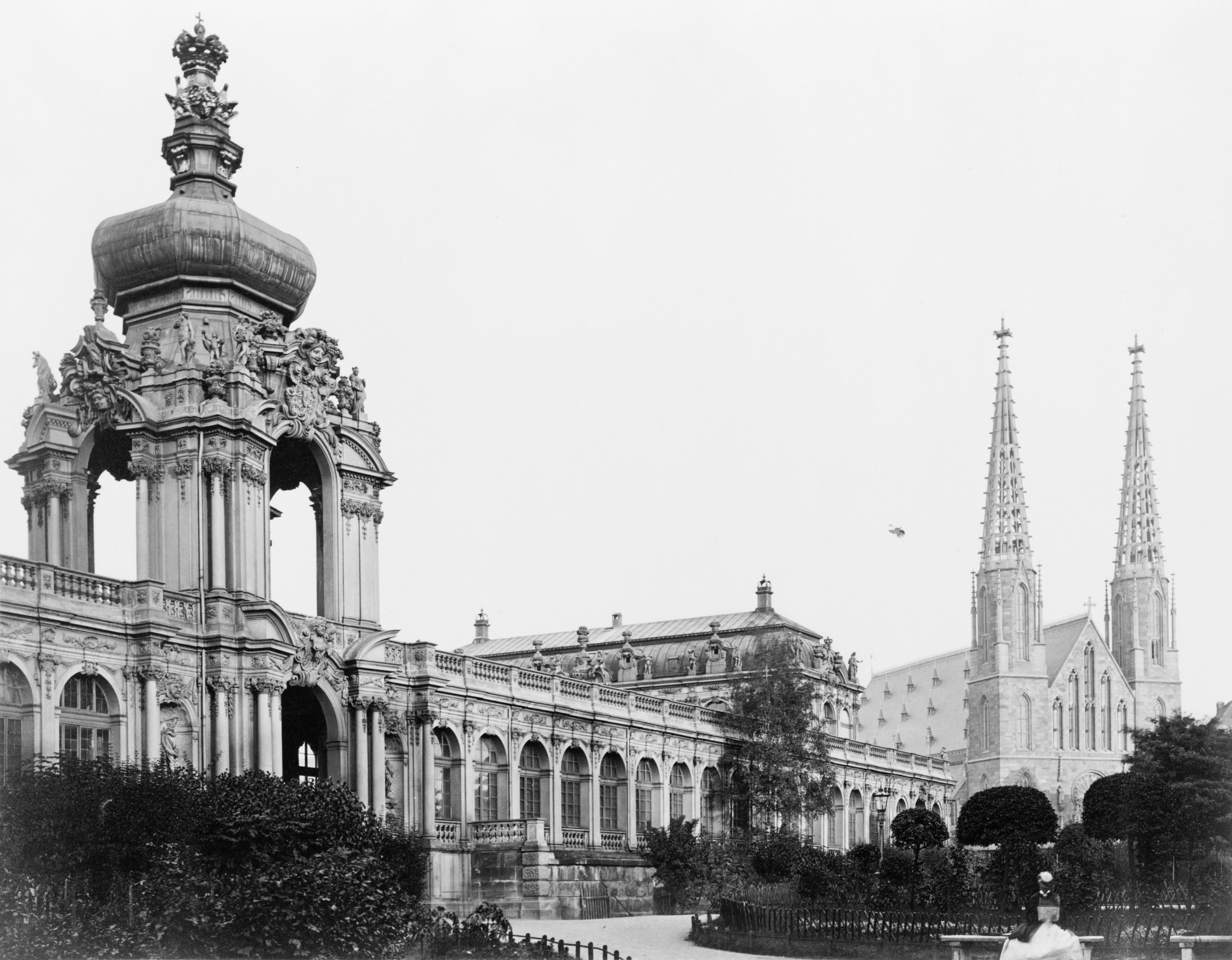
Dresden in Saxony where, in April 1879, Philip Arthur Ashworth married Emma Charlotte Marie Leontina, Baroness von Estorff.

== Early life and education ==
He was the eldest son of the Rev John Ashworth Ashworth, rector of Didcot in Berkshire. His father had been a Fellow of Brasenose College, Oxford, until resigning on marriage in 1851, when his college preferred him to the rectory of All Saints, Didcot which he occupied for 39 years. The Perpendicular west window of the church is a memorial to the Ashworth family.

Philip Arthur Ashworth was educated at Sherborne School, subsequently graduating with a BA from New College, Oxford in Classics and Law in 1875. He went on to study at the University of Bonn, the University of Leipzig and the University of Würzburg, from which he emerged as a Doctor of Jurisprudence.

In 1881 Ashworth was called to the bar in England (Inner Temple). He practised for a while in London and was briefly an advocate of the Courts of Cyprus; but he then concentrated on research and writing about international jurisprudence and English constitutional law and administration.

== Works ==
Ashworth was a prolific author, editor and translator of works on legal, constitutional, historic and military topics, with a reputation for writing "with scrupulous care and accurate scholarship", whether in English or in German. Amongst other works and many papers, he was the author of:

- Das Wittthum (Dower) im Englischen Recht, Frankfurt am Main, 1898; a study of the ancient laws of dower in England.
- Die Verfassungen der Brittischen Kolonien, Tübingen, 1911; an examination of the constitutional law of the English colonies, it formed part of the German series on political science, administrative law and constitutional law, Das Öffentliche Recht der Gegenwart.

As an editor, Ashworth was tasked with revising the 5th, 6th and 7th editions of:

- English Constitutional History: a Text-book for Students and Others, by Thomas Pitt Taswell-Langmead, London, 1896.

He was the first translator into English of major German legal, history and military works including:

- Battle for Right, by Rudolf von Jhering, London, 1883.
- Gneist, Rudolf (1891). The History of the English Constitution. Translated by Ashworth, Philip A. London: William Clowes and Sons, Limited – via Google Books.
- History of the Latin and Teutonic Nations from 1494 to 1514, by Leopold von Ranke, London, 1887.
- The Nation in Arms, by Baron von der Goltz, London, 1887.

Ashworth was also asked to contribute articles to Encyclopaedia Britannica's 10th and 11th editions on Alsace-Lorraine, Bavaria, Berlin, Germany, Heinrich Rudolf Hermann Friedrich von Gneist, Rudolf von Jhering, Lübeck, Rhine, and Eduard von Simson.

== Family ==
On 15 April 1879 Dr Ashworth married Emma Charlotte Marie Leontina Von Estorff, Baroness von Estorff (1853–1935) (née Sonntag), whose younger sister, Elizabeth, was a musician and composer who married the academic historian and classicist Sir James Wycliffe Headlam-Morley. Philip and Emma Ashworth lived in Victoria Street, Westminster and their country house in Berkshire, until retiring in 1902 to Kent. Dr Ashworth died in Paris in 1921. His widow died in Oxfordshire in 1935.

By the late twentieth century, Dr Ashworth's childhood home, now the Old Rectory at Didcot, had become home to another Oxford historian with a keen interest in German militarism, Hugh Trevor-Roper, Lord Dacre.
