= Arthur Elam Haigh =

English classical scholar

Arthur Elam Haigh (1855–1905) was an English classical scholar.

== Life ==
Born in Leeds on 27 February 1855, he was the third son, in a family of three sons and two daughters, of Joseph Haigh, a chemist, by his wife Lydia, daughter of Charles James Duncan. He was educated at Leeds Grammar School, and on 22 October 1874 matriculated at Corpus Christi College, Oxford with a scholarship. As an undergraduate, he took a first class in classical moderations in 1875 and in literæ humaniores in 1878; he won the two Gaisford prizes for Greek verse (1876) and Greek prose (1877), the Craven Scholarship (1879), and the Stanhope Essay Prize on the topic Political Theories of Dante (1878). He made speeches at the Oxford Union on the Liberal side, and he rowed in the Corpus Christi eight.

On graduating B.A. in 1878 (M.A. 1881) Haigh was elected to a fellowship at Hertford College, which he held till 1886. He became classical lecturer at Corpus Christi also in 1878, and for the next twenty-seven years taught there and at other colleges. In 1901 he was admitted fellow of Corpus Christi, and was appointed senior tutor the following year. He was classical moderator in 1888–9, and again in 1897–8. He laid more stress than most Oxford tutors of his time on verbal accuracy and the need for close textual study.

Haigh died at his residence in the Parks at Oxford on 20 December 1905, and was buried in Holywell churchyard.

== Works ==
Haigh collaborated with Thomas Leslie Papillon in an edition of Virgil (1892). He also published The Attic Theatre (1889) and The Tragic Drama of the Greeks (1896).

== Family ==
In August 1886 Haigh married Matilda Forth, daughter of Jeremiah Giles Pilcher. She predeceased him in July 1904, leaving four children. Of the sons, Charles Roderick, elder brother of Arthur Duncan, was killed on 7 November 1914 in the First Battle of Ypres

== Notes ==
Attribution

This article incorporates text from a publication now in the public domain: Lee, Sidney, ed. (1912). "Haigh, Arthur Elam". Dictionary of National Biography (2nd supplement). Vol. 2. London: Smith, Elder & Co.

== Sources ==
- Low, S. J.; Smail. "Haigh, Arthur Elam (1855–1905)first2= Richard". Oxford Dictionary of National Biography (online ed.). Oxford University Press. doi:10.1093/ref:odnb/33635. (Subscription or UK public library membership required.)
