= Thomas Pitt Taswell-Langmead =

English barrister and academic

Thomas Pitt Langmead (1840–1882), from 1864 known as Thomas Pitt Taswell-Langmead, was an English barrister and academic, known as a writer on constitutional law and history.

== Life ==
He was son of Thomas Langmead, by Elizabeth, daughter of Stephen Cock Taswell. He was educated at King's College London, the inns of court, and St Mary Hall, Oxford. He entered on 9 May 1860 the Inner Temple, and 9 July 1862 Lincoln's Inn, where he took the Tancred studentship, and in Easter term 1863 was called to the bar. At Oxford he graduated B.A. in 1866, taking first class honours in law and modern history. The same year he was awarded the Stanhope prize for an essay on the reign of Richard II (published, Oxford: Rivingtons, 1866), and in 1887 the Vinerian scholarship.

Taswell-Langmead practised as a conveyancer, and was appointed in 1873 tutor in constitutional law and legal history at the inns of court. He also held the post of revising barrister under the River Lea Conservancy Acts, and for seven years preceding his death was joint editor of the Law Magazine and Review.

In 1882 Taswell-Langmead was appointed professor of English constitutional law and legal history at University College, London. He died unmarried at Brighton on 8 December the same year, and was buried at Nunhead cemetery.

== Works ==
In 1875 Taswell-Langmead published English Constitutional History: a Text-book for Students and Others, his major work and including some original research. A second edition appeared in 1880, a third in 1886 (revised by Charles Henry Edward Carmichael), and a fourth in 1890. The fifth, sixth and seventh editions were edited by Philip Arthur Ashworth.

In 1858 Langmead edited for the Camden Society Sir Edward Lake's Account of his Interviews with Charles I, on being created a Baronet (Camden Miscellany vol. iv.). He contributed to Notes and Queries, 2nd ser. vi. 380, the outline of a scheme for the better preservation of parochial records, which he later developed in a pamphlet Parish Registers: a Plea for their Preservation (1872). He wrote an article on the same topic to the 'Law Magazine and Review' in May 1878, and drafted William Copeland Borlase's unsuccessful Parish Registers Bill of 1882. Another contribution to the Law Magazine and Review was an article on "The Representative Peerage of Scotland and Ireland", May 1876.

== Notes ==
Attribution

This article incorporates text from a publication now in the public domain: Lee, Sidney, ed. (1892). "Langmead, Thomas Pitt". Dictionary of National Biography. Vol. 32. London: Smith, Elder & Co.
