= Stanhope essay prize =

The Stanhope essay prize was an undergraduate history essay prize created at Balliol College, Oxford, by Philip Henry Stanhope, 5th Earl Stanhope in 1855.

== Notable winners ==
Notable Stanhope Prize winners:

- John Richard Magrath, 1860
- Francis Jeune, 1863, 1st Baron St Helier
- Thomas Pitt Taswell-Langmead, 1866
- Thomas Buchanan, 1868, Liberal politician
- Arthur Francis Leach, 1872
- Richard Lodge, 1875
- Charles Harding Firth, 1877, British historian
- Arthur Elam Haigh, 1878
- Holden Hutton, 1881
- John Bruce Williamson, 1883, barrister, historian and writer
- William Carr, 1884, biographer
- Owen Morgan Edwards, 1886
- George Arnold Wood, 1889, English Australian historian
- John Buchan, 1897, British novelist
- Robert Rait, 1899

- Robert Howard Hodgkin was proxime

- Alfred Eckhard Zimmern, 1902, New College, Oxford, British classical scholar and historian
- Archibald Main, 1903
- Henry Delacombe Roome, KC, 1904, Barrister
- George Stuart Gordon, 1905
- Eustace Percy, 1st Baron Percy of Newcastle, 1907, British politician and public servant
- Vivian Hunter Galbraith, 1911, English historian
- Michael Sadleir, 1912
- Aldous Huxley, 1916, English writer
- Bruce McFarlane, 1924
- K. B. McFarlane, 1924
- Bernard Miller, 1925, British businessman
- Maurice Ashley, editor of The Listener
- Derek Pattinson, 1951, Secretary-General of the General Synod of the Church of England

== In fiction ==
In Max Beerbohm's satirical tragedy of undergraduate life at Oxford, Zuleika Dobson (1911), the hero Duke of Dorset was awarded, amongst others, the Stanhope:

At Eton he had been called "Peacock", and this nick-name had followed him up to Oxford. It was not wholly apposite, however. For, whereas the peacock is a fool even among birds, the Duke had already taken (besides a particularly brilliant First in Mods) the Stanhope, the Newdigate, the Lothian, and the Gaisford Prize for Greek Verse.
