= Durham Chancery Act 1869 =

Act of the Parliament of the United Kingdom

Durham Chancery Act 1869 (Note: The citation of this act by this short title was authorised by section 1 of, and the first schedule to, the Short Titles Act 1896. Due to the repeal of those provisions it is now authorised by section 19(2) of the Interpretation Act 1978.)
- Act of Parliament
- Parliament of the United Kingdom
- Long title: An Act to abolish the office of Cursitor of the Court of Chancery in the palatine of Durham.
- Citation: 32 & 33 Vict. c. 84
- Territorial extent: United Kingdom

Dates
- Royal assent: 9 August 1869
- Commencement: 9 August 1869 (Note: Section 1.)
- Repealed: 23 May 1950
Other legislation
Amended by	Statute Law Revision (No. 2) Act 1893
Repealed by	Statute Law Revision Act 1950

Status: Repealed

Text of statute as originally enacted

The Durham Chancery Act 1869 (32 & 33 Vict. c. 84) was an act of the Parliament of the United Kingdom. It was one of the Durham County Palatine Acts 1836 to 1889.

== Subsequent developments ==
The preamble, and the following words to "same as follows", and in section 1, the words "from and after the passing of this Act", in both places they occurred, were repealed by section 1 of, and the first schedule to, the Statute Law Revision (No. 2) Act 1893 (56 & 57 Vict. c. 54), which came into force on 22 September 1893.

The whole act was repealed by section 1(1) of, and the first schedule to, the Statute Law Revision Act 1950 (14 Geo. 6. c. 6), which came into force on 23 May 1950.
