= List of acts of the Parliament of the United Kingdom from 1852 =

This is a complete list of acts of the Parliament of the United Kingdom for the year 1852.

Note that the first parliament of the United Kingdom was held in 1801; parliaments between 1707 and 1800 were either parliaments of Great Britain or of Ireland). For acts passed up until 1707, see the list of acts of the Parliament of England and the list of acts of the Parliament of Scotland. For acts passed from 1707 to 1800, see the list of acts of the Parliament of Great Britain. See also the list of acts of the Parliament of Ireland.

For acts of the devolved parliaments and assemblies in the United Kingdom, see the list of acts of the Scottish Parliament, the list of acts of the Northern Ireland Assembly, and the list of acts and measures of Senedd Cymru; see also the list of acts of the Parliament of Northern Ireland.

The number shown after each act's title is its chapter number. Acts passed before 1963 are cited using this number, preceded by the year(s) of the reign during which the relevant parliamentary session was held; thus the Union with Ireland Act 1800 is cited as "39 & 40 Geo. 3 c. 67", meaning the 67th act passed during the session that started in the 39th year of the reign of George III and which finished in the 40th year of that reign. Note that the modern convention is to use Arabic numerals in citations (thus "41 Geo. 3" rather than "41 Geo. III"). Acts of the last session of the Parliament of Great Britain and the first session of the Parliament of the United Kingdom are both cited as "41 Geo. 3".

Some of these acts have a short title. Some of these acts have never had a short title. Some of these acts have a short title given to them by later acts, such as by the Short Titles Act 1896.

== 15 & 16 Vict. ==
The fifth session of the 15th Parliament of the United Kingdom, which met from 3 February 1852 until 1 July 1852.

=== Public general acts ===
Short title	Citation	Royal assent
Long title
Supply Act 1852 (repealed)	15 & 16 Vict. c. 1	30 March 1852
An Act to apply the Sum of Eight Millions out of the Consolidated Fund to the Service of the Year One thousand eight hundred and fifty-two. (Repealed by Statute Law Revision Act 1875 (38 & 39 Vict. c. 66))
Annual Inclosure Act 1852 or the Inclosures Act 1852	15 & 16 Vict. c. 2	20 April 1852
An Act to authorize the Inclosure of certain Lands, in pursuance of the Seventh Annual and also of a Special Report of the Inclosure Commissioners for England and Wales.
Estates of Intestates, etc. Act 1852 (repealed)	15 & 16 Vict. c. 3	20 April 1852
An Act to provide for the Administration of Personal Estates of Intestates and others to which Her Majesty may be entitled in right of Her Prerogative or in right of Her Duchy of Lancaster. (Repealed by Treasury Solicitor Act 1876 (39 & 40 Vict. c. 18) and Duchy of Lancaster Act 1920 (10 & 11 Geo. 5. c. 51) and for the Republic of Ireland by Statute Law Revision Act 2007 (No. 28 (RoI)))
Indemnity Act 1852 (repealed)	15 & 16 Vict. c. 4	20 April 1852
An Act to indemnify such Persons in the United Kingdom as have omitted to qualify themselves for Offices and Employments, and to extend the Time limited for those Purposes respectively. (Repealed by Promissory Oaths Act 1871 (34 & 35 Vict. c. 48))
Municipal Corporations Act 1852 (repealed)	15 & 16 Vict. c. 5	20 April 1852
An Act further to explain and amend the Acts for the Regulation of Municipal Corporations in England and Wales, and in Ireland. (Repealed for England and Wales by Statute Law Revision Act 1875 (38 & 39 Vict. c. 66), Municipal Corporations Act 1882 (45 & 46 Vict. c. 50) and Local Government Act 1933 (23 & 24 Geo. 5. c. 51) and for Northern Ireland by Statute Law Revision Act 1875 (38 & 39 Vict. c. 66), Statute Law Revision Act 1892 (55 & 56 Vict. c. 19) and Local Government (Ireland) Act 1898 (61 & 62 Vict. c. 37))
Protection of Inventions Act 1852 (repealed)	15 & 16 Vict. c. 6	20 April 1852
An Act for extending the Term of the provisional Registration of Inventions under "The Protection of Inventions Act, 1851." (Note: Protection of Inventions Act 1851 (14 & 15 Vict. c. 8)) (Repealed by Statute Law Revision Act 1875 (38 & 39 Vict. c. 66))
Mutiny Act 1852 (repealed)	15 & 16 Vict. c. 7	20 April 1852
An Act for punishing Mutiny and Desertion, and for the better Payment of the Army and their Quarters. (Repealed by Statute Law Revision Act 1875 (38 & 39 Vict. c. 66))
Marine Mutiny Act 1852 (repealed)	15 & 16 Vict. c. 8	20 April 1852
An Act for the Regulation of Her Majesty's Royal Marine Forces while on shore. (Repealed by Statute Law Revision Act 1875 (38 & 39 Vict. c. 66))
Disfranchisement of St. Alban's Act 1852 (repealed)	15 & 16 Vict. c. 9	3 May 1852
An Act to disfranchise the Borough of Saint Alban. (Repealed by Statute Law Revision Act 1875 (38 & 39 Vict. c. 66))
Exchequer Bills Act 1852 (repealed)	15 & 16 Vict. c. 10	3 May 1852
An Act for raising the Sum of Seventeen millions seven hundred and forty-two thousand eight hundred Pounds by Exchequer Bills, for the Service of the Year One thousand eight hundred and fifty-two. (Repealed by Statute Law Revision Act 1875 (38 & 39 Vict. c. 66))
Sheep, etc., Disorders Prevention Act 1852 (repealed)	15 & 16 Vict. c. 11	3 May 1852
An Act to continue an Act of the Twelfth Year of Her present Majesty, to prevent the spreading of contagious or infectious Disorders among Sheep, Cattle, and other Animals. (Repealed by Statute Law Revision Act 1875 (38 & 39 Vict. c. 66))
International Copyright Act 1852 (repealed)	15 & 16 Vict. c. 12	28 May 1852
An Act to enable Her Majesty to carry into effect a Convention with France on the Subject of Copyright; to extend and explain the International Copyright Acts; and to explain the Acts relating to Copyright in Engravings. (Repealed by Copyright Act 1911 (1 & 2 Geo. 5. c. 46))
Linen, etc., Manufacturers (Ireland) Act 1852 (repealed)	15 & 16 Vict. c. 13	28 May 1852
An Act to amend and continue certain Acts relating to Linen, Hempen, and other Manufactures in Ireland. (Repealed by Statute Law Revision Act 1875 (38 & 39 Vict. c. 66))
Poor Law Union Charges Act 1852 (repealed)	15 & 16 Vict. c. 14	28 May 1852
An Act to continue an Act of the Fifteenth Year of Her present Majesty, for charging the Maintenance of certain poor Persons in Unions in England and Wales upon the Common Fund. (Repealed by Statute Law Revision Act 1875 (38 & 39 Vict. c. 66))
Loan Societies Act 1852 (repealed)	15 & 16 Vict. c. 15	28 May 1852
An Act to continue an Act to amend the Laws relating to Loan Societies. (Repealed by Statute Law Revision Act 1875 (38 & 39 Vict. c. 66))
Repayment of Advances (Ireland) Act 1852 (repealed)	15 & 16 Vict. c. 16	28 May 1852
An Act to amend the Acts relating to the Repayment of Advances made to Districts in Ireland. (Repealed by Statute Law Revision Act 1861 (24 & 25 Vict. c. 101))
Ecclesiastical Jurisdiction Act 1852 (repealed)	15 & 16 Vict. c. 17	28 May 1852
An Act for further continuing certain temporary Provisions concerning Ecclesiastical Jurisdiction in England. (Repealed by Statute Law Revision Act 1875 (38 & 39 Vict. c. 66))
Poor Rates Act 1852 (repealed)	15 & 16 Vict. c. 18	28 May 1852
An Act to continue the Exemption of Inhabitants from Liability to be rated as such in respect of Stock in Trade or other Property to the Relief of the Poor. (Repealed by Statute Law Revision Act 1875 (38 & 39 Vict. c. 66))
Highway Rates Act 1852 (repealed)	15 & 16 Vict. c. 19	28 May 1852
An Act to continue an Act for authorizing the Application of Highway Rates to Turnpike Roads. (Repealed by Statute Law Revision Act 1875 (38 & 39 Vict. c. 66))
Income Tax Act 1852 (repealed)	15 & 16 Vict. c. 20	28 May 1852
An Act to continue the Duties on Profits arising from Property, Professions, Trades, and Offices. (Repealed by Statute Law Revision Act 1875 (38 & 39 Vict. c. 66))
Stamps Act 1852 (repealed)	15 & 16 Vict. c. 21	17 June 1852
An Act to continue the Stamp Duties granted by an Act of the Fifth and Sixth Years of Her present Majesty, (Note: Stamp Duties (Ireland) Act 1842 (5 & 6 Vict. c. 82)) to assimilate the Stamp Duties in Great Britain and Ireland, and to make Regulations for collecting and managing the same. (Repealed by Statute Law Revision Act 1875 (38 & 39 Vict. c. 66))
Turnpike Acts (Ireland) Act 1852 (repealed)	15 & 16 Vict. c. 22	17 June 1852
An Act to continue certain Acts for regulating Turnpike Roads in Ireland. (Repealed by Statute Law Revision Act 1875 (38 & 39 Vict. c. 66))
Meeting of Parliament Act 1852 (repealed)	15 & 16 Vict. c. 23	17 June 1852
An Act to shorten the Time required for assembling Parliament after a Dissolution thereof. (Repealed by Representation of the People Act 1918 (7 & 8 Geo. 5. c. 64) and for the Republic of Ireland by Electoral Act 1963 (No. 19 (RoI)))
Wills Act Amendment Act 1852 (repealed)	15 & 16 Vict. c. 24	17 June 1852
An Act for the Amendment of an Act passed in the First Year of the Reign of Her Majesty Queen Victoria, intituled "An Act for the Amendment of the Laws with respect to Wills." (Note: Wills Act 1837 (7 Will. 4 & 1 Vict. c. 26)) (Repealed for England and Wales and Scotland by Administration of Justice Act 1982 (c. 53), for Northern Ireland by Wills and Administration Proceedings (Northern Ireland) Order 1994 (SI 1994/1899 (N.I. 13)) and for the Republic of Ireland by Succession Act 1965 (No. 27 (RoI)))
General Register Office Act 1852 (repealed)	15 & 16 Vict. c. 25	17 June 1852
An Act to amend an Act (Note: Births and Deaths Registration Act 1836 (6 & 7 Will. 4. c. 86)) for Registering Births, Deaths, and Marriages in England. (Repealed by Registration Service Act 1953 (1 & 2 Eliz. 2. c. 37))
Foreign Deserters Act 1852 (repealed)	15 & 16 Vict. c. 26	17 June 1852
An Act to enable Her Majesty to carry into effect Arrangements made with Foreign Powers for the Apprehension of Seamen who desert from their Ships. (Repealed by Merchant Shipping Act 1894 (57 & 58 Vict. c. 60))
Evidence (Scotland) Act 1852	15 & 16 Vict. c. 27	17 June 1852
An Act to amend the Law of Evidence in Scotland.
Commissioners of Works Act 1852 (repealed)	15 & 16 Vict. c. 28	17 June 1852
An Act to amend the Crown Lands Act, 1851, (Note: Crown Lands Act 1851 (14 & 15 Vict. c. 42)) and to vest the Building appropriated for the Accommodation of the Supreme Courts of Justice in Edinburgh in the Commissioners of Works. (Repealed for the Republic of Ireland by Statute Law Revision Act 2007 (No. 28 (RoI)))
Kennington Common Act 1852	15 & 16 Vict. c. 29	17 June 1852
An Act to empower the Commissioners of Her Majesty's Works and Public Buildings to inclose and lay out Kennington Common in the County of Surrey as Pleasure Grounds for the Recreation of the Public.
Belfast Custom House Act 1852 (repealed)	15 & 16 Vict. c. 30	17 June 1852
An Act to empower the Commissioners of Her Majesty's Customs to acquire certain Lands and Houses in the Borough of Belfast, for the Purpose of erecting a Custom House and other Offices and Buildings required for the Public Service in the said Borough. (Repealed for the Republic of Ireland by Statute Law Revision Act 2007 (No. 28 (RoI)))
Industrial and Provident Societies Act 1852 or the Industrial and Provident Societies Partnership Act 1852 or Slaney's Act (repealed)	15 & 16 Vict. c. 31	30 June 1852
An Act to legalize the Formation of Industrial and Provident Societies. (Repealed by Industrial and Provident Societies Act 1862 (25 & 26 Vict. c. 87))
Burghs (Scotland) Act 1852 (repealed)	15 & 16 Vict. c. 32	30 June 1852
An Act to alter and amend certain Provisions in the Laws relating to the Number and Election of Magistrates and Councillors in the Burghs in Scotland. (Repealed by Town Councils (Scotland) Act 1900 (63 & 64 Vict. c. 49))
Turnpike Debts Act 1852 (repealed)	15 & 16 Vict. c. 33	30 June 1852
An Act to confirm certain Provisional Orders made under an Act of the last Session, (Note: Turnpike Trusts (Making of Provisional Orders) Act 1851 (14 & 15 Vict. c. 38)) "to facilitate Arrangements for the Relief of Turnpike Trusts, and to make certain Provisions respecting Exemptions from Tolls." (Repealed by Statute Law Revision Act 1894 (57 & 58 Vict. c. 56))
Landed Property Improvement (Ireland) Act 1852 (repealed)	15 & 16 Vict. c. 34	30 June 1852
An Act to extend the Act (Note: Landed Property Improvement (Ireland) Act 1847 (10 & 11 Vict. c. 32)) to facilitate the Improvement of Landed Property in Ireland, and the Acts amending the same, to the Erection of Scutch Mills for Flax in Ireland. (Repealed for Northern Ireland by Statute Law Revision Act 1892 (55 & 56 Vict. c. 19), Statute Law Revision Act 1894 (57 & 58 Vict. c. 56) and Public Works, etc., Loans Act (Northern Ireland) 1953 (c. 13 (N.I.)) and for the Republic of Ireland by Land and Conveyancing Law Reform Act 2009 (No. 27 (RoI)))
Representative Peers (Scotland) Act 1852 (repealed)	15 & 16 Vict. c. 35	30 June 1852
An Act to amend an Act passed in the last Session of Parliament, intituled "An Act to regulate certain Proceedings in relation to the Election of Representative Peers for Scotland." (Note: Representative Peers (Scotland) Act 1851 (14 & 15 Vict. c. 87)) (Repealed by Promissory Oaths Act 1871 (34 & 35 Vict. c. 48))
Protestant Dissenters Act 1852 (repealed)	15 & 16 Vict. c. 36	30 June 1852
An Act to amend the Law relating to the certifying and registering Places of Religious Worship of Protestant Dissenters. (Repealed by Places of Worship Registration Act 1855 (18 & 19 Vict. c. 81))
Poor Law Commission (Ireland) Act 1852 (repealed)	15 & 16 Vict. c. 37	30 June 1852
An Act to continue the Poor Law Commission for Ireland. (Repealed by Statute Law Revision Act 1875 (38 & 39 Vict. c. 66))
Justices Jurisdiction Act 1852 (repealed)	15 & 16 Vict. c. 38	30 June 1852
An Act to explain Two Acts of the Twelfth and Thirteenth Years of the Reign of Her Majesty, concerning the Appointments of Overseers, (Note: Poor Law (Overseers) Act 1849 (12 & 13 Vict. c. 8)) and the Authority of Justices of the Peace to act in certain Matters relating to the Poor in Cities and Boroughs. (Note: Poor Law (Justices Jurisdiction) Act 1849 (12 & 13 Vict. c. 64)) (Repealed by Distress for Rates Act 1960 (8 & 9 Eliz. 2. c. 12))
Crown Revenues (Colonies) Act 1852 (repealed)	15 & 16 Vict. c. 39	30 June 1852
An Act to remove Doubts as to the Lands and Casual Revenues of the Crown in the Colonies and Foreign Possessions of Her Majesty. (Repealed by Statute Law Revision Act 1950 (14 Geo. 6. c. 6) and for the Republic of Ireland by Statute Law Revision Act 2007 (No. 28 (RoI)))
Inland Revenue Office Act 1852	15 & 16 Vict. c. 40	30 June 1852
An Act for carrying into execution an Agreement for the Sale of Property belonging to Her Majesty, in right of Her Crown and of Her Duchy of Lancaster, to the Commissioners of Inland Revenue; and for enabling such Commissioners to dispose of their present Chief Office and other Property in the City of London.
Huddersfield Burial Ground Act 1852 (repealed)	15 & 16 Vict. c. 41	30 June 1852
An Act to provide a Burial Ground for the Township of Huddersfield in the County of York. (Repealed by West Yorkshire Act 1980 (c. xiv))
First Public Health Supplemental Act 1852	15 & 16 Vict. c. 42	30 June 1852
An Act to confirm certain Provisional Orders of the General Board of Health, and to amend the Public Health Act, 1848. (Note: Public Health Act 1848 (11 & 12 Vict. c. 63))
	Worthing	
	Worksop	
	Gainsborough	
	Rotherham and Kimberworth	
	Burnham	
	Calne	
	Banbury	
Parliamentary Oaths Act 1852 (repealed)	15 & 16 Vict. c. 43	30 June 1852
An Act to repeal certain Disabilities under the First of George the First, Chapter Thirteen, (Note: Security of the Sovereign Act 1714 (1 Geo. 1. St. 2. c. 13)) and the Sixth of George the Third, Chapter Fifty-three. (Note: Treason Act 1766 (6 Geo. 3. c. 53)) (Repealed by Promissory Oaths Act 1871 (34 & 35 Vict. c. 48))
Passengers Act 1852 (repealed)	15 & 16 Vict. c. 44	30 June 1852
An Act to amend and consolidate the Laws relating to the Carriage of Passengers by Sea. (Repealed by Passengers Act 1855 (18 & 19 Vict. c. 119))
Turnpike Roads in Yorkshire Act 1852 or the Sunk Islands Roads Act 1852	15 & 16 Vict. c. 45	30 June 1852
An Act for making a Turnpike Road between Stone Creek and Sunk Island Church in the County of York, and between Sunk Island Church and Patrington Haven, and for consolidating with such Roads the present Turnpike Road from Sunk Island Church to Ottringham, and for constructing Quays and Wharfs at Stone Creek.
Navy Pay Act 1852 (repealed)	15 & 16 Vict. c. 46	30 June 1852
An Act to amend an Act of the Eleventh Year of King George the Fourth, (Note: Pay of the Navy Act 1830 (11 Geo. 4 & 1 Will. 4. c. 20)) for amending and consolidating the Laws relating to the Pay of the Royal Navy. (Repealed by Admiralty, &c. Acts Repeal Act 1865 (28 & 29 Vict. c. 112))
Differential Duties on Foreign Ships Act 1852 (repealed)	15 & 16 Vict. c. 47	30 June 1852
An Act to enable Her Majesty to abolish otherwise than by Treaty, on Condition of Reciprocity, Differential Duties on Foreign Ships. (Repealed by Statute Law Revision Act 1875 (38 & 39 Vict. c. 66))
Property of Lunatics Act 1852 (repealed)	15 & 16 Vict. c. 48	30 June 1852
An Act for the Amendment of the Law respecting the Property of Lunatics. (Repealed by Lunacy Act 1890 (53 & 54 Vict. c. 5))
School Sites Act 1852	15 & 16 Vict. c. 49	30 June 1852
An Act to extend the Provisions of the several Acts passed for the Conveyance of Sites for Schools. (Repealed for Scotland by Education (Scotland) Act 1945 (8 & 9 Geo. 6. c. 37) and for the Republic of Ireland by Statute Law Revision Act 2007 (No. 28 (RoI)))
Militia Act 1852 (repealed)	15 & 16 Vict. c. 50	30 June 1852
An Act to consolidate and amend the Laws relating to the Militia in England. (Repealed by Territorial Army and Militia Act 1921 (11 & 12 Geo. 5. c. 37))
Copyhold Act 1852 (repealed)	15 & 16 Vict. c. 51	30 June 1852
An Act to extend the Provisions of the Acts for the Commutation of Manorial Rights, and for the gradual Enfranchisement of Lands of Copyhold and Customary Tenure. (Repealed by Copyhold Act 1894 (57 & 58 Vict. c. 46) and for the Republic of Ireland by Land and Conveyancing Law Reform Act 2009 (No. 27 (RoI)))
Colonial Bishops Act 1852 (repealed)	15 & 16 Vict. c. 52	30 June 1852
An Act to provide for the exercise of certain powers vested in the Bishop of Quebec in respect of districts severed from his diocese. (Repealed by Overseas and Other Clergy (Ministry and Ordination) Measure 1967 (No. 3) and Statute Law (Repeals) Act 1973 (c. 39) and for the Republic of Ireland by Statute Law Revision Act 2007 (No. 28 (RoI)))
Bishop of Quebec Act 1852 (repealed)	15 & 16 Vict. c. 53	30 June 1852
An Act to provide for the Exercise of certain Powers vested in the Bishop of Quebec in respect of Districts severed from his Diocese. (Repealed by Statute Law (Repeals) Act 1973 (c. 39))
County Courts Act 1852 (repealed)	15 & 16 Vict. c. 54	30 June 1852
An Act further to facilitate and arrange Proceedings in the County Courts. (Repealed by County Courts Act 1888 (51 & 52 Vict. c. 43))
Trustee Act 1852 (repealed)	15 & 16 Vict. c. 55	30 June 1852
An Act to extend the provisions of "The Trustee Act, 1850." (Note: Trustee Act 1850 (13 & 14 Vict. c. 60)) (Repealed by Statute Law Revision Act 1892 (55 & 56 Vict. c. 19) and Trustee Act 1893 (56 & 57 Vict. c. 53), for Northern Ireland by Mental Health (Northern Ireland) Order 1986 (SI 1986/595 (N.I. 4)) and for the Republic of Ireland by Land and Conveyancing Law Reform Act 2009 (No. 27 (RoI)))
Pharmacy Act 1852 (repealed)	15 & 16 Vict. c. 56	30 June 1852
An Act for regulating the Qualifications of Pharmaceutical Chemists. (Repealed by Pharmacy Act 1954 (2 & 3 Eliz. 2. c. 61))
Election Commissioners Act 1852 (repealed)	15 & 16 Vict. c. 57	30 June 1852
An Act to provide for more effectual Inquiry into the Existence of corrupt Practices at Elections for Members to serve in Parliament. (Repealed by Election Commissioners Act 1949 (12, 13 & 14 Geo. 6. c. 90) and House of Commons Disqualification Act 1957 (5 & 6 Eliz. 2. c. 20) and for Northern Ireland by Statute Law Revision (Northern Ireland) Act 1976 (c. 12))
Annual Turnpike Acts Continuance Act 1852 or the Turnpike Acts, Great Britain Act 1852 (repealed)	15 & 16 Vict. c. 58	30 June 1852
An Act to continue certain Turnpike Acts in Great Britain. (Repealed by Statute Law Revision Act 1875 (38 & 39 Vict. c. 66))
Poor Law Boards (England) Act 1852 (repealed)	15 & 16 Vict. c. 59	30 June 1852
An Act to continue the Poor Law Board. (Repealed by Statute Law Revision Act 1875 (38 & 39 Vict. c. 66))
Savings Banks Act 1852 (repealed)	15 & 16 Vict. c. 60	30 June 1852
An Act to continue an Act of the Twelfth Year of Her Present Majesty, (Note: Savings Banks (Ireland) Act 1848 (11 & 12 Vict. c. 133)) for amending the Laws relating to Savings Banks in Ireland. (Repealed by Statute Law Revision Act 1875 (38 & 39 Vict. c. 66))
Penalties, etc., under Excise Acts 1852 (repealed)	15 & 16 Vict. c. 61	30 June 1852
An Act to amend the Laws relating to Summary Proceedings for Penalties and Forfeitures under the Acts relating to the Excise. (Repealed by Inland Revenue Regulation Act 1890 (53 & 54 Vict. c. 21))
Crown Lands Act 1852 (repealed)	15 & 16 Vict. c. 62	30 June 1852
An Act to alter and amend certain Acts relating to the Woods, Forests, and Land Revenues of the Crown. (Repealed by Crown Estate Act 1961 (9 & 10 Eliz. 2. c. 55))
Valuation (Ireland) Act 1852 (repealed)	15 & 16 Vict. c. 63	30 June 1852
An Act to amend the Laws relating to the Valuation of rateable Property in Ireland. (Repealed by Rates (Northern Ireland) Order 1972 (SI 1972/1633 (N.I. 16)))
Metropolitan Sewers Act 1852 (repealed)	15 & 16 Vict. c. 64	30 June 1852
An Act to continue and amend the Metropolitan Sewers Act. (Repealed by Statute Law Revision Act 1875 (38 & 39 Vict. c. 66))
Friendly Societies Act 1852 (repealed)	15 & 16 Vict. c. 65	30 June 1852
An Act to continue and amend an Act passed in the Fourteenth Year of the Reign of Her present Majesty, (Note: Friendly Societies Act 1850 (13 & 14 Vict. c. 115)) to consolidate and amend the Laws relating to Friendly Societies. (Repealed by Friendly Societies Act 1855 (18 & 19 Vict. c. 63))
Crime and Outrage (Ireland) Act 1852 (repealed)	15 & 16 Vict. c. 66	30 June 1852
An Act to continue an Act of the Eleventh Year of Her present Majesty, (Note: Prevention of Crime (Ireland) Act 1848 (11 & 12 Vict. c. 2)) for the better Prevention of Crime and Outrage in certain Parts of Ireland. (Repealed by Statute Law Revision Act 1875 (38 & 39 Vict. c. 66))
Incumbered Estates (Ireland) Act 1852 (repealed)	15 & 16 Vict. c. 67	30 June 1852
An Act to continue the Powers of applying for a Sale of Lands under the Act (Note: Incumbered Estates (Ireland) Act 1849 (12 & 13 Vict. c. 77)) for facilitating the Sale and Transfer of Incumbered Estates in Ireland. (Repealed by Statute Law Revision Act 1875 (38 & 39 Vict. c. 66))
Distressed Unions (Ireland) Act 1852 (repealed)	15 & 16 Vict. c. 68	30 June 1852
An Act for the Application of certain Money accrued from Fines and Forfeitures in Ireland in aid of certain distressed Unions and Electoral Divisions in that Country. (Repealed by Statute Law Revision Act 1875 (38 & 39 Vict. c. 66))
Public Health Supplemental Act 1852 (No. 2) or the Public Health Supplemental (No. 2) Act 1852	15 & 16 Vict. c. 69	30 June 1852
An Act to confirm certain Provisional Orders of the General Board of Health.
	Wisbeach	
	Walsoken	
	Salisbury	
	Ashby-de-la-Zouch	
	Woolwich	
	Stratford-upon-Avon	
	Leamington	
	Newbury	
Holloway Prison Act 1852 (repealed)	15 & 16 Vict. c. 70	30 June 1852
An Act for authorizing the Occupation of the House of Correction recently erected by and for the City of London at Holloway in the County of Middlesex. (Repealed by Statute Law (Repeals) Act 1975 (c. 10))
Thames Embankment Act 1852 (repealed)	15 & 16 Vict. c. 71	30 June 1852
An Act to amend an Act of the Ninth and Tenth Years of Her present Majesty (Note: Battersea Bridge and Embankment, etc. Act 1846 (9 & 10 Vict.. c. 39)) for the Embankment of a Portion of the River Thames. (Repealed by Local Law (Greater London Council and Inner London Boroughs) Order 1965 (SI 1965/540))
New Zealand Constitution Act 1852 (repealed)	15 & 16 Vict. c. 72	30 June 1852
An Act to grant a Representative Constitution to the Colony of New Zealand. (Repealed by Statute Law (Repeals) Act 1989 (c. 43))
Common Law Courts Act 1852 (repealed)	15 & 16 Vict. c. 73	30 June 1852
An Act to make Provision for a permanent Establishment of Officers to perform the Duties at Nisi Prius, in the Superior Courts of Common Law, and for the Payment of such Officers and of the Judges Clerks by Salaries, and to abolish certain Offices in those Courts. (Repealed by Supreme Court of Judicature (Officers) Act 1879 (42 & 43 Vict. c. 78), Administration of Justice Act 1925 (15 & 16 Geo. 5. c. 28) and Supreme Court of Judicature (Consolidation) Act 1925 (15 & 16 Geo. 5. c. 49) and for the Republic of Ireland by Statute Law Revision Act 2007 (No. 28 (RoI)))
Militia Pay Act 1852 (repealed)	15 & 16 Vict. c. 74	30 June 1852
An Act to defray the Charge of the Pay, Clothing, and contingent and other Expenses of the Disembodied Militia in Great Britain and Ireland; to grant Allowances in certain Cases to Subaltern Officers, Adjutants, Paymasters, Quartermasters, Surgeons, Assistant Surgeons, Surgeons Mates, and Serjeant Majors of the Militia; and to authorize the Employment of the Non-commissioned Officers. (Repealed by Statute Law Revision Act 1875 (38 & 39 Vict. c. 66))
Militia Ballots Suspension Act 1852 (repealed)	15 & 16 Vict. c. 75	30 June 1852
An Act to suspend the making of Lists and the Ballots and Enrolments for the Militia of the United Kingdom. (Repealed by Statute Law Revision Act 1875 (38 & 39 Vict. c. 66))
Common Law Procedure Act 1852	15 & 16 Vict. c. 76	30 June 1852
An Act to amend the Process, Practice, and Mode of Pleading in the Superior Courts of Common Law at Westminster, and in the Superior Courts of the Counties Palatine of Lancaster and Durham.
Bankruptcy Act 1852 (repealed)	15 & 16 Vict. c. 77	30 June 1852
An Act to abolish the Office of Lord Chancellor's Secretary of Bankrupts, and to regulate the Office of Chief Registrar of the Court of Bankruptcy. (Repealed by Bankruptcy Repeal and Insolvent Court Act 1869 (32 & 33 Vict. c. 83))
Pimlico Improvements Act 1852	15 & 16 Vict. c. 78	30 June 1852
An Act to enable the Commissioners of Her Majesty's Works and Public Buildings to complete Improvements in Pimlico and in the Neighbourhood of Buckingham Palace.
Inclosure Act 1852 or the Inclosures Act 1852	15 & 16 Vict. c. 79	30 June 1852
An Act to amend and further extend the Acts for the Inclosure, Exchange, and Improvement of Land.
Master in Chancery Abolition Act 1852 or the Court of Chancery Act 1852 (repealed)	15 & 16 Vict. c. 80	30 June 1852
An Act to abolish the Office of Master in Ordinary of the High Court of Chancery, and to make Provision for the more speedy and efficient Despatch of Business in the said Court. (Repealed by Supreme Court of Judicature (Consolidation) Act 1925 (15 & 16 Geo. 5. c. 49))
County Rates Act 1852 (repealed)	15 & 16 Vict. c. 81	30 June 1852
An Act to consolidate and amend the Statutes relating to the Assessment and Collection of County Rates in England and Wales. (Repealed by Local Government Act 1948 (11 & 12 Geo. 6. c. 26))
Appropriation Act 1852 (repealed)	15 & 16 Vict. c. 82	1 July 1852
An Act to apply a Sum out of the Consolidated Fund, and certain other Sums, to the Service of the Year One thousand eight hundred and fifty-two, and to appropriate the Supplies granted in this Session of Parliament. (Repealed by Statute Law Revision Act 1875 (38 & 39 Vict. c. 66))
Patent Law Amendment Act 1852 (repealed)	15 & 16 Vict. c. 83	1 July 1852
An Act for amending the Law for granting Patents for Inventions. (Repealed by Patents, Designs, and Trade Marks Act 1883 (46 & 47 Vict. c. 57))
Metropolis Water Act 1852	15 & 16 Vict. c. 84	1 July 1852
An Act to make better Provision respecting the Supply of Water to the Metropolis.
Burial Act 1852 or the Burials Act 1851 or the Metropolitan Burial Act 1852	15 & 16 Vict. c. 85	1 July 1852
An Act to amend the Laws concerning the Burial of the Dead in the Metropolis.
Court of Chancery Procedure Act 1852 (repealed)	15 & 16 Vict. c. 86	1 July 1852
An Act to amend the Practice and Course of Proceeding in the High Court of Chancery. (Repealed by Statute Law Revision Act 1875 (38 & 39 Vict. c. 66), Supreme Court of Judicature (Officers) Act 1879 (42 & 43 Vict. c. 78), Conveyancing Act 1881 (44 & 45 Vict. c. 41), Statute Law Revision and Civil Procedure Act 1881 (44 & 45 Vict. c. 59), Statute Law Revision and Civil Procedure Act 1883 (46 & 47 Vict. c. 49) and Commissioners for Oaths Act 1889 (52 & 53 Vict. c. 10))
Suitors in Chancery Relief Act 1852 or the Court of Chancery Act 1852 (repealed)	15 & 16 Vict. c. 87	1 July 1852
An Act for the Relief of the Suitors of the High Court of Chancery. (Repealed by Mental Health Act 1959 (7 & 8 Eliz. 2. c. 72))
Bishopric of Christ Church, New Zealand Act 1852	15 & 16 Vict. c. 88	1 July 1852
An Act to remove Doubts as to the Constitution of the Bishopric of Christchurch in New Zealand, and to enable Her Majesty to constitute such Bishopric and to subdivide the Diocese of New Zealand.

=== Local acts ===
Short title	Citation	Royal assent
Long title
Mansfield Gas Act 1852	15 & 16 Vict. c. i	3 May 1852
An Act for repealing the Act (Note: Mansfield Gas Act 1823 (4 Geo. 4. c. c)) relating to "The Mansfield Gaslight Company," and for conferring upon the Company further and additional Powers; and for other Purposes.
Patent Solid Sewage Manure Company's Act 1852 (repealed)	15 & 16 Vict. c. ii	3 May 1852
An Act for the Incorporation, Establishment, and Regulation of the "Patent Solid Sewage Manure Company," and for enabling the said Company to purchase and work Letters Patent. (Repealed by Patent Solid Sewage Manure Company's Act 1854 (17 & 18 Vict. c. clxvi))
Liverpool Library and Museum Act 1852 (repealed)	15 & 16 Vict. c. iii	3 May 1852
An Act for establishing a Public Library, Museum, and Gallery of Arts at Liverpool, and to make Provision for the Reception of a Collection of Specimens illustrative of Natural History presented by the Earl of Derby for the Benefit of the Inhabitants of the Borough of Liverpool and the Neighbourhood thereof, and others resorting thereto. (Repealed by Liverpool Corporation Act 1921 (11 & 12 Geo. 5. c. lxxiv))
Wolverhampton Gas Act 1852	15 & 16 Vict. c. iv	3 May 1852
An Act for repealing the Wolverhampton Gas Act, 1847, (Note: Wolverhampton Gas Act 1847 (10 & 11 Vict. c. xv)) and for re-constituting the Company with additional Powers; and for other Purposes.
Yaxley Drainage Amendment Act 1852	15 & 16 Vict. c. v	3 May 1852
An Act to amend an Act (Note: Undrained Fen, Yaxley (Huntingdonshire) Act 1831 (1 Will. 4. c. liii)) for draining certain Fen Lands and Low Grounds in the Parish of Yaxley in the County of Huntingdon, and to remove certain Doubts, and facilitate the Execution of the said Act.
Scarborough Public Market Act 1852	15 & 16 Vict. c. vi	3 May 1852
An Act for providing a covered Market in the Borough of Scarborough in the County of York, for improving the Approaches thereto, for removing the present Market, and for regulating the Markets and Fairs in such Borough.
East London Waterworks Act 1852 or the East London Waterworks Act (No. 1) 1852 (repealed)	15 & 16 Vict. c. vii	3 May 1852
An Act for enabling the Company of Proprietors of the East London Waterworks to raise a further Sum of Money; and for other Purposes. (Repealed by East London Waterworks Act (No. 2) 1852 (15 & 16 Vict. c. clxiv))
Barnsley Gas Act 1852	15 & 16 Vict. c. viii	28 May 1852
An Act to repeal the Barnsley Gas Act, (Note: Barnsley Gas Act 1821 (1 & 2 Geo. 4. c. lxxv)) and to make other Provisions in lieu thereof, and to authorize the raising of a further Sum of Money.
Bristol and Exeter Railway (Yeovil Branch) Act 1852	15 & 16 Vict. c. ix	28 May 1852
An Act to extend the Powers of the Act (Note: Bristol and Exeter Railway Act 1845 (8 & 9 Vict. c. clv)) relating to the Yeovil Branch of the Bristol and Exeter Railway, and to authorize a Deviation in the Line of such Branch Railway.
Macclesfield Improvement Act 1852	15 & 16 Vict. c. x	28 May 1852
An Act for the Improvement of the Municipal Borough of Macclesfield.
Great Munster Fair Act 1852	15 & 16 Vict. c. xi	28 May 1852
An Act for providing a convenient Place or Fair Green, with proper Approaches thereto, for holding Fairs for the Sale of Cattle and other Animals, Wool, and Flax, in the Province of Munster at or near the City of Limerick, and for regulating such Fairs.
Skipton and Craco Turnpike Road Act 1852	15 & 16 Vict. c. xii	28 May 1852
An Act for improving, diverting, and maintaining as Turnpike the Road leading from Skipton to Craco in the Parish of Burnsal, all in the West Riding of the County of York.
Portsea Island Gas Company Act 1852	15 & 16 Vict. c. xiii	28 May 1852
An Act to authorize the Portsea Island Gaslight Company to raise a further Sum of Money.
Derby Gas Act 1852	15 & 16 Vict. c. xiv	28 May 1852
An Act for better lighting with Gas the Borough of Derby and its Neighbourhood, and for other Purposes.
Belfast Gas Act 1852	15 & 16 Vict. c. xv	28 May 1852
An Act to repeal An Act (Note: Belfast Gas Act 1823 (4 Geo. 4. c. xxxvii)) for lighting with Gas the Town of Belfast and the Suburbs thereof, and to make other Provisions for that Purpose.
Vale of Neath Railway Act 1852	15 & 16 Vict. c. xvi	28 May 1852
An Act to enable the Vale of Neath Railway Company to construct certain Extensions of their Lines of Railway, and for other Purposes.
Lockwood and Meltham Turnpike Road Act 1852	15 & 16 Vict. c. xvii	28 May 1852
An Act to repeal an Act passed in the Sixth Year of the Reign of King George the Fourth, intituled "An Act for amending, improving, and maintaining the Road from Lockwood to Meltham, and the Branch of Road to Meltham Mills, all in the Parish of Almondbury in the West Riding of the County of York," (Note: Road from Lockwood to Meltham Act 1825 (6 Geo. 4. c. lxxxvi)) and for the widening and better maintaining and repairing the said Road, and for other Purposes.
Stockton Extension and Improvement Act 1852 (repealed)	15 & 16 Vict. c. xviii	28 May 1852
An Act for the Extension of the Boundaries of the Municipal Borough of Stockton in the County of Durham; and for transferring to the Corporation of the said Borough the Properties and Effects now vested in certain Commissioners having Jurisdiction in the Township of Stockton; and to provide for the better draining, cleansing, paving, watching, lighting, and otherwise improving the said Borough. (Repealed by Stockton-on-Tees Extension and Improvement Act 1869 (32 & 33 Vict. c. lxxiv))
Stockton and Darlington Railway Act 1852	15 & 16 Vict. c. xix	28 May 1852
An Act for increasing the Capital of the Stockton and Darlington Railway Company, and for other Purposes.
Barnstaple Markets Act 1852	15 & 16 Vict. c. xx	28 May 1852
An Act for the Establishment of a new Market in Barnstaple, and for the Improvement and Regulation of the existing Markets and Fairs therein.
River Medina Navigation Act 1852	15 & 16 Vict. c. xxi	28 May 1852
An Act to enable the Mayor, Aldermen, and Burgesses of the Borough of Newport in the Isle of Wight to raise Monies for the Improvement of the Navigation of the River Medina, within the Borough, and to alter and amend certain ancient Tolls and Duties payable to the said Mayor, Aldermen, and Burgesses.
Droitwich Junction Canal Act 1852	15 & 16 Vict. c. xxii	28 May 1852
An Act for making a Canal from the Droitwich Canal at Droitwich in the County of Worcester, to join the Worcester and Birmingham Canal at or near Hanbury Wharf in the Parish of Hanbury in the same County, and to be called "The Droitwich Junction Canal."
Ilkley Waterworks Act 1852	15 & 16 Vict. c. xxiii	28 May 1852
An Act for supplying the Inhabitants of the Township of Ilkley in the West Riding of the County of York with Water.
Great Southern and Western Railway (Ireland) Act 1852	15 & 16 Vict. c. xxiv	28 May 1852
An Act for reviving and continuing the Powers granted by "The Great Southern and Western Railway (Ireland) Extension, Portarlington to Tullamore, Act, 1847," (Note: Great Southern and Western Railway (Ireland) Extension, Portarlington to Tullamore Act 1847 (10 & 11 Vict. c. xciii)) for the compulsory Purchase of Lands and Completion of Works.
Norfolk Railway (Regulation of Capital) Act 1852	15 & 16 Vict. c. xxv	28 May 1852
An Act for defining and regulating the Capital of tho Norfolk Railway Company, and for authorizing Arrangements with the Halesworth, Beccles, and Haddiscoe Railway Company, and for other Purposes.
Dudley Waterworks Amendment Act 1852	15 & 16 Vict. c. xxvi	28 May 1852
An Act for enabling the Dudley Waterworks Company to raise a further Sum of Money, and for amending the Provisions of the Act (Note: Dudley Water Act 1834 (4 & 5 Will. 4. c. xlii)) relating to such Company.
Sunderland and South Shields Waterworks Act 1852	15 & 16 Vict. c. xxvii	28 May 1852
An Act for better supplying with Water the Boroughs of Sunderland and South Shields and other Places in the County of Durham.
Aberdare Market Act 1852	15 & 16 Vict. c. xxviii	28 May 1852
An Act for establishing a Market and for providing a Market House and Slaughter-houses at Aberdare in the County of Glamorgan.
Thetford Drainage Act 1852	15 & 16 Vict. c. xxix	28 May 1852
An Act to amend an Act passed in the Seventh Year of the Reign of Her Majesty Queen Victoria, (Note: Thetford Inclosure and Drainage Act 1844 (7 & 8 Vict. c. xxix)) for inclosing Lands in the Hamlet of Thetford in the Isle of Ely, and for draining certain Lands in the said Hamlet and in other Parishes in the said Isle, so far as relates to such draining.
Eastern Counties Railway Act 1852	15 & 16 Vict. c. xxx	28 May 1852
An Act to enable the Eastern Counties Railway Company to construct a Railway to the River Nene or Wisbech River below Wisbech, in lieu of a Portion of the Railway authorized by "The Wisbech, Saint Ives, and Cambridge Junction Railway Act, 1846," (Note: Wisbech, St. Ives and Cambridge Junction Railway Act 1846 (9 & 10 Vict. c. ccclvi)) and to erect Warehouses in connexion with such Railway, and for other Purposes.
Cheshire Constabulary Act 1852 (repealed)	15 & 16 Vict. c. xxxi	28 May 1852
An Act to amend an Act passed in the Tenth Tear of the Reign of His Majesty King George the Fourth, intituled "An Act to enable the Magistrates of the County Palatine of Chester to appoint Special High Constables for the several Hundreds or Divisions, and Assistant Petty Constables for the several Townships of that County." (Note: Cheshire Constables Act 1829 (10 Geo. 4. c. xcvii)) (Repealed by Cheshire County Council Act 1980 (c. xiii))
Rhyl Improvement Act 1852 (repealed)	15 & 16 Vict. c. xxxii	28 May 1852
An Act for paving, lighting, watching, draining, supplying with Water, cleansing, regulating, and otherwise improving the Township of Rhyl in the County of Flint, for making a Cemetery, and for establishing and regulating a Market and Market Places therein. (Repealed by Clwyd County Council Act 1985 (c. xliv))
Eastern Counties (East and West India Dock Branches) Railway Act 1852 (repealed)	15 & 16 Vict. c. xxxiii	28 May 1852
An Act to enable the Eastern Counties Railway Company to construct Branch Railways to the East and West India Docks and Birmingham Junction Railway, and to enlarge and improve their Goods Station in the Parish of Saint Matthew Bethnal Green; and for other Purposes. (Repealed by Great Eastern Railway Act 1862 (25 & 26 Vict. c. ccxxiii))
Union Arcade Company (Glasgow) Dissolution Act 1852	15 & 16 Vict. c. xxxiv	28 May 1852
An Act for the Dissolution of the "Union Arcade Company" (Glasgow), and for the Abandonment of the Undertaking.
Cork and Bandon Railway Amendment Act 1852 (repealed)	15 & 16 Vict. c. xxxv	28 May 1852
An Act to enable the Cork and Bandon Railway Company to raise further Capital, and to make Arrangements with respect to their present Capital and Mortgage Debt; and for other Purposes. (Repealed by Cork and Bandon Railway Act 1853 (16 & 17 Vict. c. ccii))
York, Newcastle and Berwick Railway (Thirsk and Malton Branch) Act 1852	15 & 16 Vict. c. xxxvi	28 May 1852
An Act for enabling the York, Newcastle, and Berwick Railway Company to make a Deviation in the Line of their Thirsk and Malton Branch; and to enable the Malum and Driffield Junction Railway Company to subscribe towards and enter into Agreements with respect to the said Branch; and for other Purposes.
Malton and Driffield Junction Railway Act 1852	15 & 16 Vict. c. xxxvii	28 May 1852
An Act for enabling the Malton and Driffield Junction Railway Company to subscribe towards the Construction of the Thirsk and Malton Branch of the York, Newcastle, and Berwick Railway, and to make Arrangements as to their Capital; and for other Purposes.
London and Southampton Turnpike Road through Bishops Waltham Act 1852	15 & 16 Vict. c. xxxviii	28 May 1852
An Act to amend and extend the Provisions of the Act (Note: Road from the Botley Turnpike Road Act 1823 (4 Geo. 4. c. xlvi)) relating to "The London and Southampton Turnpike Road through Bishops Waltham," and to create a further Term therein; and for other Purposes.
Bury (Sussex) Turnpike Road Act 1852	15 & 16 Vict. c. xxxix	28 May 1852
An Act to repeal the Act (Note: Arundel and Fittleworth Common Road Act 1824 (5 Geo. 4. c. xvii)) for more effectually repairing the Road leading from the High Street in the Town of Arundel in the County of Sussex to the Turnpike Road leading from Petworth to Stopham on Fittleworth Common in the said County, and to make other Provisions in lieu thereof.
Retford and Littleborough Turnpike Road Act 1852	15 & 16 Vict. c. xl	28 May 1852
An Act for managing and repairing the Turnpike Road leading from the Eastern Side of a certain Bridge called Spittle Hill Bridge over Moorgate Beck in the Parish of Clarborough in the County of Nottingham to Littleborough Ferry in the same County.
Dundalk and Enniskillen Railway Act 1852	15 & 16 Vict. c. xli	28 May 1852
An Act to amend the Acts relating to the Dundalk and Enniskillen Railway, and to extend the same from Ballybay to Enniskillen.
Deptford Gas Company's Act 1852 (repealed)	15 & 16 Vict. c. xlii	28 May 1852
An Act for incorporating the Deptford Gaslight and Coke Company. (Repealed by Surrey Consumers Gas Company (Purchase of Deptford Gasworks) Act 1855 (18 & 19 Vict. c. clxxxvi))
Londonderry and Coleraine Railway Consolidation Act 1852	15 & 16 Vict. c. xliii	28 May 1852
An Act to consolidate and amend the Acts relating to the Londonderry and Coleraine Railway Company; and to authorize the said Company to contribute towards the Construction of a new Bridge over the River Foyle and other Works at Londonderry.
Londonderry and Enniskillen Railway Consolidation Act 1852	15 & 16 Vict. c. xliv	28 May 1852
An Act to consolidate and amend the Acts relating to the Londonderry and Enniskillen Railway Company, and to grant further Powers to the said Company for the Extension and Completion of the Railway, and for other Purposes.
Forth and Clyde Navigation Amendment Act 1852	15 & 16 Vict. c. xlv	28 May 1852
An Act to amend the Acts relating to the Forth and Clyde Navigation, to alter the Place of Meeting, and to make further Provision for the Management of the Affairs of the Company of Proprietors of the said Navigation.
Glamford Briggs Waterworks Act 1852 (repealed)	15 & 16 Vict. c. xlvi	28 May 1852
An Act to enable Gary Charles Elwes Esquire to construct Waterworks for the Supply of Water to Glamford Briggs and the Neighbourhood thereof in Lincolnshire. (Repealed by Brigg Water Order 1952 (SI 1952/1589))
Liverpool Corporation Waterworks (Deviations) Act 1852 (repealed)	15 & 16 Vict. c. xlvii	28 May 1852
An Act for further amending the Local and Personal Acts, Ninth and Tenth of Victoria, Chapter One hundred and twenty-seven, (Note: Liverpool Sanitation Act 1846 (9 & 10 Vict. c. cxxvii)) and Tenth and Eleventh of Victoria, Chapter Two hundred and sixty-one, (Note: Liverpool Corporation Waterworks Act 1847 (10 & 11 Vict. c. cclxi)) relating to the Liverpool Corporation Waterworks; and for authorizing Deviations, and the Construction of Reservoirs; and for other Purposes. (Repealed by Liverpool Corporation Act 1921 (11 & 12 Geo. 5. c. lxxiv))
Scottish Provincial Assurance Company Act 1852 (repealed)	15 & 16 Vict. c. xlviii	28 May 1852
An Act for incorporating the Aberdeen Fire and Life Assurance Company, by the Name of "The Scottish Provincial Assurance Company;" for enabling the said Company to sue and be sued, and to take and hold Property; and for other Purposes relating to the said Company. (Repealed by North British and Mercantile Insurance Company's Scottish Provincial Transfer Act 1889 (52 & 53 Vict. c. cxlii))
Sheffield Bridges and Streets Act 1852	15 & 16 Vict. c. xlix	28 May 1852
An Act to enable the Mayor, Aldermen, and Burgesses of the Borough of Sheffield to make certain Bridges over the River Dun, Roads, Streets, and other Works, all within the Borough of Sheffield.
Cheltenham Improvement Act 1852	15 & 16 Vict. c. l	28 May 1852
An Act for better paving, draining, lighting, cleansing, supplying with Water, regulating in regard to Markets, Interments, Hackney Carriages, and other Purposes, and otherwise improving the Borough of Cheltenham in the County of Gloucester.
Eastern Counties and Newmarket Railways Arrangements Act 1852 (repealed)	15 & 16 Vict. c. li	28 May 1852
An Act to confirm an Agreement therein mentioned between the Eastern Counties Railway Company and the Newmarket Railway Company. (Repealed by Great Eastern Railway Act 1862 (25 & 26 Vict. c. ccxxiii))
Porthdinallaen and Nanthwynant Turnpike Roads Act 1852	15 & 16 Vict. c. lii	28 May 1852
An Act for repairing and managing the Roads leading from Porthdinllaen, by way of Tan-y-Graig, Pwllheli, Llanystymdwy, and Cerrig-y-Rhwydwr, to or near Capel Cerrig, and from Pwllheli aforesaid, by way of Crugan, to the Yillage of Llanbedrog, all in the County of Caernarvon.
British Empire Mutual Life Assurance Act 1852 (repealed)	15 & 16 Vict. c. liii	28 May 1852
An Act for the better Regulation of the British Empire Mutual Life Assurance Company; for enabling the said Company to take and hold Property; and for other Purposes relating to the said Company. (Repealed by Pelican and British Empire Life Office Act 1903 (3 Edw. 7. c. xiii))
Romsey, Stockbridge and Wallop Turnpike Roads Act 1852	15 & 16 Vict. c. liv	28 May 1852
An Act for more effectually repairing the Roads leading from Romsey to Stockbridge and Wallop, and other Roads therein mentioned, in the County of Southampton.
Southam and Kineton Turnpike Road Act 1852	15 & 16 Vict. c. lv	28 May 1852
An Act for the Establishment of a Turnpike Road from Southam to Kineton, both in the County of Warwick.
Accidental Death Insurance Company's Act 1852	15 & 16 Vict. c. lvi	28 May 1852
An Act for the Amalgamation of the Accidental Death Insurance Company, and the Railway Assurance Company, and for enabling such amalgamated Company to insure against Death or other personal Injury arising from Accident or Violence.
York and North Midland (East and West Yorkshire Railway Amalgamation) Act 1852	15 & 16 Vict. c. lvii	28 May 1852
An Act for amalgamating the East and West Yorkshire Junction Railway Company with the York and North Midland Railway Company, and for vesting the Undertaking of the former Company in that of the latter, and for other Purposes.
Dumfries and Maxwelltown Waterworks Amendment Act 1852	15 & 16 Vict. c. lviii	28 May 1852
An Act to explain and amend the Act (Note: Dumfries and Maxwelltown Waterworks Act 1850 (13 & 14 Vict. c. xxxiv)) for supplying the Burghs of Dumfries and Maxwelltown and Suburbs with Water.
Haw Bridge Act 1852	15 & 16 Vict. c. lix	28 May 1852
An Act for continuing the Term and amending and extending the Provisions of the Acts relating to the Haw Passage Bridge in the County of Gloucester.
Bedford and Kimbolton Road Act 1852	15 & 16 Vict. c. lx	28 May 1852
An Act to repeal the Acts relating to the Road from the Town of Bedford in the County of Bedford to Kimbolton in the County of Huntingdon, and to substitute other Provisions.
Deeside Railway Act 1852	15 & 16 Vict. c. lxi	28 May 1852
An Act for enabling the Deeside Railway Company to alter the Line and Levels of Part of their Railway, and to abandon Parts thereof; for altering the Capital of the Company, and repealing and amending the Act (Note: Deeside Railway (Aberdeen to Aboyne) Act 1846 (9 & 10 Vict. c. clviii)) relating thereto; and for other Purposes.
Kelvin Bridge (Glasgow) Act 1852	15 & 16 Vict. c. lxii	17 June 1852
An Act for constructing a Bridge across the River Kelvin, near Hillhead, Glasgow, in the County of Lanark, with Approaches and Works.
Somerset Central Railway Act 1852 (repealed)	15 & 16 Vict. c. lxiii	17 June 1852
An Act for making a Railway from Highbridge to Glastonbury in the County of Somerset, to be called "The Somerset Central Railway;" and for other Purposes. (Repealed by Somerset Central Railway Act 1855 (18 & 19 Vict. c. clxxxii))
Athlone Market Act 1852	15 & 16 Vict. c. lxiv	17 June 1852
An Act for regulating the Markets and Fairs and the Tolls and Customs of the Borough of Athlone.
Newmarket Extension Railway Act 1852 (repealed)	15 & 16 Vict. c. lxv	17 June 1852
An Act to enable the Newmarket Railway Company to make certain Alterations in the Levels of their Railway, and to construct a new Line of Railway between Newmarket in the County of Cambridge and Bury St Edmunds in the County of Suffolk; to alter their Capital; and for other Purposes. (Repealed by Great Eastern Railway Act 1862 (25 & 26 Vict. c. ccxxiii))
South Essex Estuary and Reclamation Act 1852	15 & 16 Vict. c. lxvi	17 June 1852
An Act for reclaiming from the Sea certain Lands on and near the Eastern and South-eastern Coast of Essex.
Lancaster Waterworks and Gas Act 1852	15 & 16 Vict. c. lxvii	17 June 1852
An Act for supplying the Borough of Lancaster in the County Palatine of Lancaster and adjacent Places with Water, and for other Purposes.
Runcorn Improvement Act 1852 (repealed)	15 & 16 Vict. c. lxviii	17 June 1852
An Act for better paving, lighting, watching, cleansing, and otherwise improving the Town of Runcorn and certain Parts of the Township of Halton in the County of Chester, for regulating the Markets therein, and for other Purposes. (Repealed by Cheshire County Council Act 1980 (c. xiii))
St. Helens Gas Act 1852	15 & 16 Vict. c. lxix	17 June 1852
An Act for better lighting with Gas the Town of Saint Helen's, the Hamlet of Hardshaw-cum-Windle, and the several Townships of Windle, Parr, Eccleston, and Sutton, all in the Parish of Prescot in the County Palatine of Lancaster.
Ulverstone Waterworks Act 1852	15 & 16 Vict. c. lxx	17 June 1852
An Act for better supplying with Water the Town of Ulverston in the County of Lancaster, and for other Purposes.
Abbey Tintern and Bigswear Turnpike Roads Act 1852	15 & 16 Vict. c. lxxi	17 June 1852
An Act for continuing the Term and amending and extending the Provisions of the Act (Note: Redbrook and St. Arvans Turnpike Road and River Wye Bridge Act 1824 (5 Geo. 4. c. xxix)) relating to the Abbey Tintern and Bigswear Roads.
London (City) Improvement Act 1852	15 & 16 Vict. c. lxxii	17 June 1852
An Act for effecting Improvements in the City of London.
Middlesbrough and Guisborough Railway Act 1852 (repealed)	15 & 16 Vict. c. lxxiii	17 June 1852
An Act for making a Railway from the Middlesbrough and Redcar Railway near Middlesbrough to or near to Guisbrough, with Branches to the Cleveland Hills, and for making Arrangements with the Stockton and Darlington Railway Company. (Repealed by Stockton and Darlington Railway Amalgamation Act 1858 (21 & 22 Vict. c. cxvi))
Sharples and Hoghton Road Act 1852	15 & 16 Vict. c. lxxiv	17 June 1852
An Act for more effectually repairing the Road from Sharpies to Hoghton in the County of Lancaster.
North Shields and Morpeth Turnpike Road Act 1852	15 & 16 Vict. c. lxxv	17 June 1852
An Act for more effectually repairing the Road leading from North Shields to Morpeth Castle, and several Branches of Road communicating therewith, all in the County of Northumberland.
Merthyr Tydfil Waterworks Act 1852 (repealed)	15 & 16 Vict. c. lxxvi	17 June 1852
An Act for supplying the Inhabitants of the Town of Merthyr Tydfil and adjacent Places with Water. (Repealed by Merthyr Tydfil Water Act 1858 (21 & 22 Vict. c. xii))
London (City) Small Debts Extension Act 1852 (repealed)	15 & 16 Vict. c. lxxvii	17 June 1852
An Act for the more easy Recovery of Small Debts and Demands within the City of London and the Liberties thereof. (Repealed by Courts Act 1971 (c. 23))
Glasgow, Kilmarnock and Ardrossan Railway Dissolution Act 1852	15 & 16 Vict. c. lxxviii	17 June 1852
An Act for the Dissolution of the Glasgow, Kilmarnock, and Ardrossan Railway Company, and the Abandonment of their Undertaking; and for other Purposes.
Shillingford, Wallingford and Reading Road Act 1852 (repealed)	15 & 16 Vict. c. lxxix	17 June 1852
An Act to renew the Term and continue and enlarge the Powers of an Act passed in the Seventh and Eighth Years of the Reign of His Majesty King George the Fourth, intituled "An Act for mare effectually repairing and improving the Road from Shillingford, in the County of Oxford, through Wallingford and Pangborne, to Reading in the County of Berks, and for repairing and maintaining a Bridge offer the River Thames of or near Shillingford Ferry." (Note: Shillingford and Reading Road Act 1827 (7 & 8 Geo. 4. c. xix)) (Repealed by Statute Law (Repeals) Act 2013 (c. 2))
Portrush Harbour Amendment Act 1852	15 & 16 Vict. c. lxxx	17 June 1852
An Act to enable the Portrush Harbour Company to improve the Navigation of the River Bann from the Salmon Leap at Castleroe above the Town of Coleraine to the Sea, and remove the Bar and Ford at Bann Mouth, and to erect a Swivel Bridge at Coleraine, all in the County of Londonderry.
Battle and Robertsbridge Road Act 1852	15 & 16 Vict. c. lxxxi	17 June 1852
An Act for maintaining the Road from Beach Down, near Battle, to Heathfield, and from the Railway Station near the Town of Robertsbridge to Hood's Corner, all in the County of Sussex.
London Gaslight Act 1852 (repealed)	15 & 16 Vict. c. lxxxii	17 June 1852
An Act for granting further Powers to the London Gaslight Company; and for other Purposes. (Repealed by Statute Law (Repeals) Act 2013 (c. 2))
Manchester, Sheffield and Lincolnshire Railway (No. 1) Act 1852	15 & 16 Vict. c. lxxxiii	17 June 1852
An Act to empower the Manchester, Sheffield, and Lincolnshire Railway Company to raise a further Sum of Money; and to amend the Acts relating to the said Company.
London, Tilbury and Southend Extension Railway Act 1852	15 & 16 Vict. c. lxxxiv	17 June 1852
An Act to enable the Eastern Counties and London and Blackwall Railway Companies to construct a Railway with Branches to Tilbury and Southend in the County of Essex, to provide a Steam Communication to Gravesend, and for other Purposes.
Stockport and Marple Roads Act 1852	15 & 16 Vict. c. lxxxv	17 June 1852
An Act for more effectually repairing the Road from Stockport in the County Palatine of Chester to Marple Bridge in the said County; and a Branch from the said Road to or near Thornset Gate in the County of Derby.
Pedmore and Rowley Road Act 1852 (repealed)	15 & 16 Vict. c. lxxxvi	17 June 1852
An Act to repeal the Acts and Parts of Acts relating to the Pedmore and Holly Hall Districts of Roads, and to substitute other Provisions for the same. (Repealed by Annual Turnpike Acts Continuance Act 1871 (34 & 35 Vict. c. 115))
Stroud and Bisley Road Act 1852 (repealed)	15 & 16 Vict. c. lxxxvii	17 June 1852
An Act to repeal the Act (Note: Stroud and Bisley Turnpike Road Act 1823 (4 Geo. 4. c. xiv)) for making and maintaining a Turnpike Road from Stroud to Bisley, and to make other Provisions in relation thereto. (Repealed by Statute Law (Repeals) Act 2013 (c. 2))
Macclesfield and Buxton Turnpike Road Act 1852	15 & 16 Vict. c. lxxxviii	17 June 1852
An Act to amend and extend the Provisions of the Macclesfield and Buxton Road Act, (Note: Road from Macclesfield to the Buxton Turnpike Road Act 1821 (1 & 2 Geo. 4. c. xxxvi)) to create a Term of Twenty-one Years, and for other Purposes.
Kirkby Stephen and Hawes Turnpike Road Act 1852	15 & 16 Vict. c. lxxxix	17 June 1852
An Act for maintaining the Turnpike Road leading from Kirkby Stephen in the County of Westmoreland into the Sedbergh and Kirkby Kendal Turnpike Road, and out of and from the same Turnpike Road to Hawes in the North Riding of the County of York, and a Branch from Hawes aforesaid to the Village of Gayle in the Township of Hawes.
Marsden, Gisburne and Long Preston Turnpike Road Act 1852 (repealed)	15 & 16 Vict. c. xc	17 June 1852
An Act for maintaining in repair the Road leading from the Lord Nelson Public House upon the Road between Burnley and Colne in the Township of Marsden in the Parish of Whalley in the County Palatine of Lancaster to Gisburne in the West Riding of the County of York, and from thence to the Road leading from Skipton to Settle at or near Long Preston in the said West Riding of the County of York. (Repealed by Annual Turnpike Acts Continuance Act 1872 (35 & 36 Vict. c. 85))
Bury and Bolton Turnpike Road Act 1852	15 & 16 Vict. c. xci	17 June 1852
An Act for maintaining in repair the Road from Bury to Bolton in the County Palatine of Lancaster.
Bramley and Ridgewick Turnpike Road Act 1852 (repealed)	15 & 16 Vict. c. xcii	17 June 1852
An Act to repeal an Act (Note: Bramley to Ridgewick Turnpike Road Act 1818 (58 Geo. 3. c. lxix)) for maintaining and repairing the Turnpike Road from Bramley in the County of Surrey to Ridgewick in the County of Sussex, and to make other Provisions in lieu thereof. (Repealed by Statute Law (Repeals) Act 2013 (c. 2))
Wakefield and Denby Dale Road Act 1852	15 & 16 Vict. c. xciii	17 June 1852
An Act to repeal the Act (Note: Wakefield and Denby Dale Turnpike Road Act 1825 (6 Geo. 4. c. xxxviii)) for repairing and maintaining the Wakefield and Denby Dale Turnpike Road, and to make other Provisions in lieu thereof.
Rotherham and Pleasley Turnpike Road Act 1852	15 & 16 Vict. c. xciv	17 June 1852
An Act for continuing the Term and amending and extending the Provisions of the Act (Note: Rotherham and Pleasley Turnpike Road Act 1826 (7 Geo. 4. c. lxxxviii)) relating to the Rotherham and Pleasley Turnpike Road.
Leven Railway Act 1852	15 & 16 Vict. c. xcv	17 June 1852
An Act for making a Railway from the Edinburgh, Perth, and Dundee Railway at Thornton Junction Station to the Town of Leven, with Branches to Kirkland Works and to the Harbour of Leven.
York and North Midland and Lancashire and Yorkshire Railways Arrangement Act 1852	15 & 16 Vict. c. xcvi	17 June 1852
An Act to enable the Lancashire and Yorkshire and York and North Midland Railway Companies to enter into Arrangements as to the working and Management of Portions of their Railways.
Beaconsfield and Red Hill Road Act 1852	15 & 16 Vict. c. xcvii	17 June 1852
An Act for more effectually repairing the Road from the Town of Beaconsfield to the River Colne, all in the County of Buckingham.
Manchester, Buxton, Matlock and Midlands Junction Railway, and Cromford Canal Leasing Act 1852	15 & 16 Vict. c. xcviii	17 June 1852
An Act for enabling the Manchester, Buxton, Matlock, and Midlands Junction Railway Company to lease their Undertaking to the London and North-Western and the Midland Railways Companies.
Kettering and Northampton Turnpike Road Act 1852 (repealed)	15 & 16 Vict. c. xcix	17 June 1852
An Act to repeal an Act (Note: Road from Kettering to Northampton Act 1819 (59 Geo. 3. c. xli)) for repairing the Road from Kettering to the Town of Northampton in the County of Northampton, and to substitute other Provisions in lieu thereof. (Repealed by Annual Turnpike Acts Continuance Act 1871 (34 & 35 Vict. c. 115))
Railway Passengers Assurance Company's Act 1852 (repealed)	15 & 16 Vict. c. c	17 June 1852
An Act to confer additional Facilities for the Insurance of Railway Passengers and other Persons by "The Railway Passengers Assurance Company." (Repealed by Railway Passengers Assurance (Consolidation) Act 1892 (55 & 56 Vict. c. viii))
Greenfield and Shepley Lane Head Road Act 1852	15 & 16 Vict. c. ci	17 June 1852
An Act to amend an Act passed in the Fourth Year of the Reign of King George the Fourth, intituled "An Act for making and maintaining a Turnpike Road from Holehouse or Riding near Greenfield in Saddleworth, to join the Stayley Turnpike Road, and also to join the Halifax and Sheffield Turnpike Road, all in the West Riding of the County of York;" (Note: Greenfield and Shepley Lane Head Road (Yorkshire, West Riding) Act 1823 (4 Geo. 4. c. lviii)) and to continue the Term thereby granted.
Leeds Waterworks (Wharfe Supply) Act 1852 (repealed)	15 & 16 Vict. c. cii	17 June 1852
An Act for enabling the Leeds Waterworks Company to provide a better Supply of Water to the Town and Neighbourhood of Leeds. (Repealed by Leeds Corporation (Consolidation) Act 1905 (5 Edw. 7. c. i))
South Eastern and Reading, Guildford and Reigate Railways Amalgamation Act 1852	15 & 16 Vict. c. ciii	17 June 1852
An Act for merging the Undertaking of the Reading, Guildford, and Reigate Railway Company in the Undertaking of the South-eastern Railway Company; for the Dissolution of the Beading, Guildford, and Reigate Railway Company; and for other Purposes.
Limerick Markets Act 1852	15 & 16 Vict. c. civ	17 June 1852
An Act for the Establishment, Maintenance, and Management of Markets in the Borough of Limerick.
London and North-western Railway Act 1852 (No. 2) or the London and North Western Railway (No. 2) Act 1852	15 & 16 Vict. c. cv	17 June 1852
An Act to authorize the Conversion of the Debenture Debt of the London and North-western Railway Company into a Stock not exceeding Three and a Half per Centum; and for enlarging the Stations at Wolverton and Kilburn.
Londonderry Bridge Act 1852 (repealed)	15 & 16 Vict. c. cvi	17 June 1852
An Act for the Construction of a new Bridge over the River Foyle at Londonderry, and Approaches thereto. (Repealed by Londonderry Bridge Act 1859 (22 Vict. c. vii))
Londonderry Improvement Act 1852	15 & 16 Vict. c. cvii	17 June 1852
An Act for the Formation of a new Street in the Borough of Londonderry.
Eastern Counties and East Anglian Railways Act 1852 (repealed)	15 & 16 Vict. c. cviii	17 June 1852
An Act to enable the Eastern Counties Railway Company to use the East Anglian Railways, and to empower the Eastern Counties Railway Company and the East Anglian Railways Company to enter into and carry into effect Agreements for certain Objects therein mentioned; and for other Purposes. (Repealed by Great Eastern Railway Act 1862 (25 & 26 Vict. c. ccxxiii))
Edinburgh and Glasgow Railway Consolidation Act 1852	15 & 16 Vict. c. cix	17 June 1852
An Act to consolidate and amend certain of the Acts relating to the Edinburgh and Glasgow Railway, and to grant farther Powers to the Company of Proprietors thereof.
Tyne Improvement Act 1852	15 & 16 Vict. c. cx	17 June 1852
An Act for repealing an Act of the Ninth Year of the Reign of Her present Majesty, (Note: Newcastle-upon-Tyne Port Act 1845 (8 & 9 Vict. c. lix)) relating to Moorings for Vessels in the River Tyne, and the River Police, and for transferring the Powers of the said Act to the Tyne Improvement Commissioners; for enabling the said Commissioners to construct and maintain Piers at the Mouth of the said River in the Counties of Durham and Northumberland, and to construct and maintain Docks and other Works on the North Side of the said River in the last-mentioned County; and for other Purposes.
Tramore Embankment Act 1852	15 & 16 Vict. c. cxi	17 June 1852
An Act for embanking and reclaiming from the Sea the Estuary or Back Strand of Tramore in the County of Waterford.
Presbyterian Widows Fund Association Act 1852	15 & 16 Vict. c. cxii	17 June 1852
An Act for the Incorporation of the Society for providing Annuities for the Widows and Children of Presbyterian Ministers, under the Style and Title of "The Presbyterian Widows Fund Association."
Yeovil and Ilchester Turnpike Trusts Act 1852	15 & 16 Vict. c. cxiii	17 June 1852
An Act to enable the Trustees of the Yeovil Turnpike Trust and the Ilchester Turnpike Trust to make certain new Roads, to repeal existing Acts, and create further Terms in the said Roads; and for other Purposes.
York, Newcastle and Berwick Railway (Auckland Branch) Act 1852	15 & 16 Vict. c. cxiv	17 June 1852
An Act for enabling the York, Newcastle, and Berwick Railway Company to make a Deviation in the Line of their Bishop Auckland Branch, to extend the Time for the Purchase of Lands and Completion of Works on certain Lines of Railway authorized to be made in the County of Durham, and for other Purposes.
Leek, Buxton and Monyash Turnpike Road Act 1852	15 & 16 Vict. c. cxv	17 June 1852
An Act for repairing the Road from Leek in the County of Stafford to Monyash, and from Middlehills to the Macclesfield Turnpike Road near Buxton in the County oi Derby, and thence to Otterhole, and certain Branches of Road communicating therewith.
Ipswich Dock Act 1852	15 & 16 Vict. c. cxvi	17 June 1852
An Act to consolidate and amend the Acts relating to the Ipswich Dock, to allow certain Drawbacks, and for other Purposes.
South Wales Railway Act 1852 (repealed)	15 & 16 Vict. c. cxvii	17 June 1852
An Act to enable the South Wales Railway Company to construct new Railways to Milford Haven and at Newport, and to abandon Portions of the Lines from Fishguard and at Haverfordwest; and for other Purposes. (Repealed by South Wales Railway Consolidation Act 1855 (18 & 19 Vict. c. xcviii))
Leeds, Bradford and Halifax Junction Railway Act 1852	15 & 16 Vict. c. cxviii	30 June 1852
An Act for making a Railway from the Lancashire and Yorkshire Railway in the Township of Bowling near Bradford to the Railway belonging to the Lancashire and Yorkshire and London and North-western Railway Companies, or One of them, in the Township of Wortley near Leeds, all in the West Riding of the County of York, to be called The Leeds, Bradford, and Halifax Junction Railway, and for other Purposes.
Blackburn and Preston Turnpike Road Act 1852 (repealed)	15 & 16 Vict. c. cxix	30 June 1852
An Act for maintaining the Road from Blackburn to Preston and the Two Branches therefrom, and erecting a Bridge on the Line of the said Road over the River Ribble, all in the County Palatine of Lancaster. (Repealed by Blackburn and Preston Turnpike Road and Bridge Act 1859 (22 & 23 Vict. c. xciii))
Preston and Garstang Turnpike Road Act 1852	15 & 16 Vict. c. cxx	30 June 1852
An Act to repeal an Act passed in the Fourth Year of the Reign of His late Majesty King George the Fourth, intituled "An Act for more effectually repairing the Road from Preston to Garstang in the County of Lancaster;" (Note: Road from Preston to Garstang Act 1823 (4 Geo. 4. c. xiii)) and to make other Provisions in lieu thereof.
Belfast Port and Harbour Conservancy Act 1852	15 & 16 Vict. c. cxxi	30 June 1852
An Act for making further Provision for the Conservancy of the Port and Harbour of Belfast, for conferring additional Powers on the Belfast Harbour Commissioners, and for other Purposes.
Blyth and Tyne Railway Act 1852	15 & 16 Vict. c. cxxii	30 June 1852
An Act for maintaining and improving the Blythe and Tyne Railway in the County of Northumberland, and for incorporating the Subscribers thereto.
Kingston and Sheetbridge Road Act 1852 (repealed)	15 & 16 Vict. c. cxxiii	30 June 1852
An Act to repeal the Act (Note: Road from Kingston-upon-Thames to Sheetbridge Act 1823 (4 Geo. 4. c. lxxix)) relating to the Road from the Town of Kingston-upon-Thames in the County of Surrey to Sheetbridge near Petersfield, in the County of Southampton; and to make other Provisions in lieu thereof. (Repealed by Annual Turnpike Acts Continuance Act 1869 (32 & 33 Vict. c. 90))
North British Flax Company's Act 1852	15 & 16 Vict. c. cxxiv	30 June 1852
An Act for the Incorporation, Establishment, and Regulation of the North British Flax Company, and to enable the said Company to purchase and work certain Letters Patent.
Frome, Yeovil and Weymouth Railway Act 1852	15 & 16 Vict. c. cxxv	30 June 1852
An Act for incorporating and giving Powers to the Frome, Yeovil, and Weymouth Railway Company, and for other Purposes.
Monmouthshire Railway and Canal Act 1852	15 & 16 Vict. c. cxxvi	30 June 1852
An Act for enabling the Monmouthshire Railway and Canal Company to make certain new Railways, and for other Purposes.
York and North Midland (Victoria Dock) Railway Act 1852 or the Yorkshire and North Midland (Victoria Dock) Railway Act 1852	15 & 16 Vict. c. cxxvii	30 June 1852
An Act for enabling the York and North Midland Railway Company to make a Railway to the Victoria or East Dock at Hull, and for other Purposes.
Nene Valley Drainage and Navigation Improvement Act 1852	15 & 16 Vict. c. cxxviii	30 June 1852
An Act for constituting Commissioners for the Improvement of the River Nene and the Navigations thereof; for the more effectual Drainage of certain Lands in the Counties of Northampton, Huntingdon, and Cambridge; and for other Purposes.
Liskeard Turnpike Roads Act 1852	15 & 16 Vict. c. cxxix	30 June 1852
An Act to amend an Act passed in the Seventh Year of the Reign of King George the Fourth, intituled "An Act for more effectually making, repairing, and improving certain Roads leading to and from Liskeard, and certain other Roads therein mentioned, in the Counties of Cornwall and Devon;" (Note: Liskeard Roads Act 1826 (7 Geo. 4. c. lxxxiv)) and for other Purposes,
River Humber Conservancy Act 1852	15 & 16 Vict. c. cxxx	30 June 1852
An Act for the Conservancy of the River Humber, and for amending some of the Provisions of an Act (Note: Kingston-upon-Hull Dock Act 1849 (12 & 13 Vict. c. lxix)) relating to the Kingston-upon-Hull Docks.
Wedmore Turnpike Road Act 1852	15 & 16 Vict. c. cxxxi	30 June 1852
An Act to extend and amend the Provisions of the Act (Note: Ashcott and Rowberrow Hill Road (Somerset) Act 1827 (7 & 8 Geo. 4. c. v)) relating to the Wedmore Turnpike Road in the County of Somerset, to create a further Term therein, and for other Purposes.
Lancashire and Yorkshire Railway Act 1852	15 & 16 Vict. c. cxxxii	30 June 1852
An Act for abandoning certain Parts of the Undertaking of the Lancashire and Yorkshire Railway Company; for constructing certain new Works, and extending the Time for Completion of existing Works; and for Sale of superfluous Lands; for regulating certain Portions of the Capital of the Company and the Application of Capital; and for authorizing the raising of Money by Annuities; and for other Purposes.
Great Western Railway (No. 2) Act 1852	15 & 16 Vict. c. cxxxiii	30 June 1852
An Act to confer on the Great Western Railway Company further Powers for the Purchase of Lands on the Lines of, and for the Construction of, the Birmingham and Oxford Junction and Birmingham, Wolverhampton, and Dudley Railways respectively; and for the Alteration of the Works of Part of the last-mentioned Railway; and for the Formation of an Extension lane of Railway at Wolverhampton; and for other Purposes.
Cambridge and Ely Roads Act 1852	15 & 16 Vict. c. cxxxiv	30 June 1852
An Act for more effectually maintaining and keeping in repair the Road from Cambridge to Ely, and other Roads therein mentioned, in the Counties of Cambridge and Norfolk.
North-western Railway Act 1852 or the North Western Railway Act 1852	15 & 16 Vict. c. cxxxv	30 June 1852
An Act for consolidating into One Act and amending the Provisions of the several Acts relating to the North-western Railway Company; for extending the Time for constructing certain Parts of their Undertaking; and granting further Powers to the said Company; and for other Purposes.
Hull Dues Act 1852 (repealed)	15 & 16 Vict. c. cxxxvi	30 June 1852
An Act for the Reduction of Dues on Shipping and Goods payable to the Mayor, Aldermen, and Burgesses of Kingston-upon-Hull, the Hull Trinity House, and the Dock Company at Kingston-upon-Hull, respectively. (Repealed by Statute Law (Repeals) Act 2008 (c. 12))
Midland Great Western Railway of Ireland (Longford Deviation and Cavan Branch) Act 1852	15 & 16 Vict. c. cxxxvii	30 June 1852
An Act to enable the Midland Great Western Railway of Ireland Company to make a Deviation in the authorized Line to Longford, and a Branch Railway to the Town of Cavan, and for other Purposes.
Torquay Market Act 1852 (repealed)	15 & 16 Vict. c. cxxxviii	30 June 1852
An Act for the better Establishment of a Market at Torquay in the County of Devon, and for other Purposes. (Repealed by Torquay Market Act 1855 (18 & 19 Vict. c. xxvii))
Asthall and Buckland Road Act 1852 (repealed)	15 & 16 Vict. c. cxxxix	30 June 1852
An Act to repeal the Acts relating to the Asthall and Buckland Turnpike Road, and to make other Provisions in lieu thereof. (Repealed by Statute Law (Repeals) Act 2013 (c. 2))
Great Western Railway Act 1852 No. 1 or the Great Western Railway (No. 1) Act 1852	15 & 16 Vict. c. cxl	30 June 1852
An Act for enabling the Completion of the Wilts, Somerset, and Weymouth Railway between Frome and Weymouth to be effected, and for authorizing and confirming Contracts between the Great Western Railway Company and the Kennet and Avon Canal Company and other Companies, and for other Purposes.
Claussen's Patent Flax Company's Act 1852	15 & 16 Vict. c. cxli	30 June 1852
An Act for incorporating Claussen's Patent Flax Company, and to enable the said Company to purchase and work certain Letters Patent.
West Hartlepool Harbour and Railway Act 1852	15 & 16 Vict. c. cxlii	30 June 1852
An Act for enabling the Amalgamation of the Stockton and Hartlepool Railway Company and the Hartlepool West Harbour and Dock Company, and for authorizing the Lease or Purchase of the Clarence Railway by the Stockton and Hartlepool Railway Company or the amalgamated Company, and for consolidating the Acts relating to the same Companies; and for other Purposes.
Cork Improvement Act 1852	15 & 16 Vict. c. cxliii	30 June 1852
An Act for the Improvement of the Borough of Cork.
Manchester, Sheffield and Lincolnshire Railway Coal Branches Act 1852	15 & 16 Vict. c. cxliv	30 June 1852
An Act to enable the Manchester, Sheffield, and Lincolnshire Railway Company to construct certain Branch Railways.
Oxford, Worcester and Wolverhampton Railway (Extensions of Time) Act 1852	15 & 16 Vict. c. cxlv	30 June 1852
An Act to amend and enlarge the Powers and Provisions of the Acts relating to the Oxford, Worcester, and Wolverhampton Railway Company; to extend the Time for the Completion of the Works, and the Purchase of certain Lands; to authorise Deviations in the Line and Works, and the Construction of certain Branches and Works; and for other Purposes.
Shrewsbury and Chester Railway (Norton and Walton Branches) Act 1852	15 & 16 Vict. c. cxlvi	30 June 1852
An Act to authorize the Shrewsbury and Chester Railway Company to construct additional Branches; to purchase or hire Steam-boats; and for other Purposes.
Wycombe Railway Amendment Act 1852	15 & 16 Vict. c. cxlvii	30 June 1852
An Act to revive and extend the Time for the Execution of certain Powers conferred by "The Wycombe Railway Act, 1846;" (Note: Wycombe Railway Act 1846 (9 & 10 Vict. c. ccxxxvi)) and for reducing the Capital of the Wycombe Railway Company; and for enabling the Company to enter into Arrangements with the Great Western Railway Company; and for other Purposes.
Eastern Union Railway Arrangements Act 1852	15 & 16 Vict. c. cxlviii	30 June 1852
An Act for enabling the Eastern Union Railway Company to make Arrangements with certain of their Creditors and Shareholders, and with respect to their Capital, and for granting additional Powers to the Company; and for other Purposes.
London Necropolis and National Mausoleum Act 1852	15 & 16 Vict. c. cxlix	30 June 1852
An Act to incorporate the London Necropolis and National Mausoleum Company, and to enable such Company to establish a Cemetery in the Parish of Woking in the County of Surrey, and for other Purposes.
Torquay Extramural Cemetery Act 1852 (repealed)	15 & 16 Vict. c. cl	30 June 1852
An Act for constructing a Cemetery near to Torquay in the County of Devon. (Repealed by Torbay Corporation Act 1971 (c. xxxiii))
Wexford Harbour Embankment Act 1852	15 & 16 Vict. c. cli	30 June 1852
An Act to repeal the Wexford Harbour Improvement Act, (Note: Wexford Harbour Improvement Act 1846 (9 & 10 Vict. c. ccclxxxvii)) and to make new Arrangements for a more effective and expeditious Execution of a Portion of the Undertaking thereby authorized, and for other Purposes.
River Slaney Improvement Act 1852 (repealed)	15 & 16 Vict. c. clii	30 June 1852
An Act to appoint Commissioners for the Execution of certain Improvements in the Navigation of the River Slaney, and for other Purposes. (Repealed by River Slaney Act 1857 (20 & 21 Vict. c. xcvii))
South Yorkshire Railway and River Dun Company's Transfer Act 1852	15 & 16 Vict. c. cliii	30 June 1852
An Act to enable the South Yorkshire Railway and River Dun Company to transfer their Undertaking to the Great Northern Railway Company.
Exeter Turnpike Roads Act 1852	15 & 16 Vict. c. cliv	30 June 1852
An Act to repeal the Acts relating to the Exeter and the Countess Wear Turnpike Roads, and to make other Provisions in lieu thereof, and to authorize the Construction of certain new Roads; and for other Purposes.
Commercial Gas Act 1852	15 & 16 Vict. c. clv	30 June 1852
An Act for the Transfer of the Undertaking of the British Gas Light Company to the Commercial Gas Company, and for other Purposes.
Chelsea Waterworks Act 1852	15 & 16 Vict. c. clvi	30 June 1852
An Act for extending the Chelsea Waterworks, and for better supplying the City of Westminster and Parts adjacent with Water.
Grand Junction Waterworks Act 1852	15 & 16 Vict. c. clvii	30 June 1852
An Act for enabling the Grand Junction Waterworks Company to obtain a Supply of Water from the Thames at Hampton, and to construct additional Works, and for other Purposes.
Southwark and Vauxhall Water Act 1852	15 & 16 Vict. c. clviii	30 June 1852
An Act for making divers Provisions with respect to the Southwark and Vauxhall Water Company, for empowering that Company to execute additional Works, and for other Purposes.
West Middlesex Waterworks Act 1852	15 & 16 Vict. c. clix	30 June 1852
An Act for enabling the Company of Proprietors of the West Middlesex Waterworks to obtain by Agreement a Supply of Water from the Thames above the Reach of the Tide, and to raise further Capital, and for other Purposes.
New River Company's Act 1852	15 & 16 Vict. c. clx	30 June 1852
An Act to enable the Governor and Company of the New River to improve their Supply of Water; and for other Purposes.
Swansea Local Board of Health Waterworks Act 1852 (repealed)	15 & 16 Vict. c. clxi	30 June 1852
An Act for enabling the Local Board of Health for the Town and District of Swansea to construct Waterworks; and for other Purposes. (Repealed by Swansea Local Board of Health Waterworks Act 1860 (23 & 24 Vict. c. cxlviii))
Tees Conservancy and Stockton Dock Act 1852	15 & 16 Vict. c. clxii	30 June 1852
An Act for the Conservancy, Improvement, and Regulation of the River Tees, the Construction of a Dock at Stockton, the Dissolution of the Tees Navigation Company, and other Purposes.
Derbyshire Mining Customs and Mineral Courts Act 1852	15 & 16 Vict. c. clxiii	30 June 1852
An Act to define and amend the Mineral Customs and to make better Provision for the Administration of Justice in the Barmote Courts within the Soke and Wapentake of Wirksworth, and within the Manors or Liberties of Crich, Ashford, Stoney Middleton, and Eyam, Hartington, Litton, Peak Forest, Tideswell, and Youlgreave, in the County of Derby.
East London Waterworks Act (No. 2) 1852 or the East London Waterworks (No. 2) Act 1852 (repealed)	15 & 16 Vict. c. clxiv	30 June 1852
An Act for making divers Provisions with respect to the East London Waterworks Company, for empowering that Company to execute additional Works, and for other Purposes. (Repealed by East London Waterworks Act 1853 (16 & 17 Vict. c. clxvi))
Shrewsbury and Birmingham Railway Amendment Act 1852	15 & 16 Vict. c. clxv	1 July 1852
An Act to authorize the Use by the Shrewsbury and Birmingham Railway Company of the Navigation Street Station in Birmingham, and for other Purposes.
Corris Machynlleth and River Dovey Railway Act 1852	15 & 16 Vict. c. clxvi	1 July 1852
An Act for making a Railway or Tramroad from the Aberllefenny Slate Quarries in the Parish of Talyllyn in the County of Merioneth to the River Dovey in the Parish of Towyn in the same County, with Branches therefrom; and for other Purposes.
Birkenhead, Lancashire and Cheshire Junction Railway Act 1852	15 & 16 Vict. c. clxvii	1 July 1852
An Act to consolidate into One Act and to amend the Provisions of the several Acts relating to the Birkenhead, Lancashire, and Cheshire Junction Railway Company, to define the Undertaking of the Company, and for other Purposes.
Great Western Railway (Traffic Arrangements) Act 1852	15 & 16 Vict. c. clxviii	1 July 1852
An Act to authorize Traffic Arrangements between the Great Western, the Shrewsbury and Hereford, and the Hereford, Ross, and Gloucester Railway Companies.

=== Private acts ===
Short title	Citation	Royal assent
Long title
Bradford Piece Halls Act 1852	15 & 16 Vict. c. 1 Pr.	28 May 1852
An Act to authorize the Improvement and better Management and eventual Leases or Sale of the Piece Halls in the Town of Bradford in the County of York; and to incorporate the Proprietors thereof.
Anna Maria, Lady Wenlock's Estate Act 1852	15 & 16 Vict. c. 2 Pr.	28 May 1852
An Act for enabling the Trustee or Trustees of the Will of the Right Honourable Anna Maria Dowager Lady Wenlock deceased to sell and dispose of a Leasehold Messuage, with the Statuary and Household Furniture by the same Will bequeathed as therein mentioned.
Manchester House of Recovery Act 1852	15 & 16 Vict. c. 3 Pr.	28 May 1852
An Act to unite the Manchester House of Recovery with the Manchester Royal Infirmary, Dispensary, and Lunatic Hospital or Asylum.
Harman's Bowden Park Estate Act 1852	15 & 16 Vict. c. 4 Pr.	17 June 1852
An Act for authorizing the Sale of the Bowden Park Estate in the County of Wilts, devised and settled by the Will of Ezekiel Harman Esquire, deceased, and certain Codicils thereto, and for laying out the Surplus of the Money produced by such Sale, after Payment of a Mortgage affecting the same, in the Purchase of other Estates to be settled to the same Uses.
John Clarkson's Estate Act 1852	15 & 16 Vict. c. 5 Pr.	17 June 1852
An Act to authorize the granting of Leases of Estates devised by the Will of John Clarkson Esquire, deceased, situate in the Counties of Middlesex and Surrey.
Balmoral Estate Act 1852	15 & 16 Vict. c. 6 Pr.	17 June 1852
An Act to enable the Trustees of the Right Honourable James Earl of Fife, deceased, to sell and convey the Estate of Balmoral in the County of Aberdeen to His Royal Highness Prince Albert of Saxe Coburg and Gotha, and to grant Feus of Parts of the Estates vested in them.
Watson's Hospital (Edinburgh) Estate Act 1852 (repealed)	15 & 16 Vict. c. 7 Pr.	17 June 1852
An Act to explain and amend the Powers of the Governors of the Hospital in Edinburgh founded by George Watson, Merchant Burgess of Edinburgh. (Repealed by Edinburgh Merchant Company Endowments Order Confirmation Act 1909 (9 Edw. 7. c. cxi))
Adams' Estate Act 1852	15 & 16 Vict. c. 8 Pr.	30 June 1852
An Act to enable Francis Adams Esquire, or other the Committee of the Estate of Mary Shute Adams, a Person of unsound Mind, for and in the Name and on behalf of the said Mary Shute Adams, to consent to the Exercise of certain Powers contained in the Marriage Settlement of the said Francis Adams, and in a certain Act of Parliament passed in the First Year of the Reign of Her present Majesty, (Note: Francis Adams's Marriage Settlement Act 1837 (7 Will. 4 & 1 Vict. c. 43 Pr.)) and to exercise the Power of appointing new Trustees contained in the said Settlement; and for extending the Powers of Sale and Exchange contained in such Settlement.
Gedling's Estate Act 1852	15 & 16 Vict. c. 9 Pr.	30 June 1852
An Act for enabling Leases and Sales to be made of Estates subject to the Will of Micah Gedling deceased, and for other Purposes, and to be called "Gedling's Estate Act, 1852."
Magdalen College, Oxford Estate Act 1852	15 & 16 Vict. c. 10 Pr.	30 June 1852
An Act to enable the President and Scholars of the College of Saint Mary Magdalen in the University of Oxford, as Owners in Fee of Lands at Wandsworth in the County of Surrey, to grant Building Leases; and for other Purposes.
Aberdeen Hammermen Incorporation Act 1852	15 & 16 Vict. c. 11 Pr.	30 June 1852
An Act to incorporate the Society of the Craft of Smiths and Hammermen of the Burgh of Aberdeen; to confirm, amend, and regulate the Administration of the Estates and Affairs of the said Society; and for other Purposes relating to the Society.
Leith Exchange Buildings Act 1852	15 & 16 Vict. c. 12 Pr.	30 June 1852
An Act to authorize the Sale of the Leith Exchange Buildings, and the Application of the Price thereof in the Extinction of Debts affecting the same; to distribute and appropriate any Balance that may arise from said Sale; and to wind up the Concern.
John Spalding's Estate Act 1852	15 & 16 Vict. c. 13 Pr.	30 June 1852
An Act to enable John Eden Spalding Esquire, under the Authority of the Judges of the Court of Session in Scotland, to raise Money by Sale or upon Security of the Estate of Holm and other Lands in the Stewartry of Kirkcudbright, for discharging certain Debts and Liabilities of the said John Eden Spalding; and for other Purposes.
Thomas Howell's Charity Act 1852	15 & 16 Vict. c. 14 Pr.	30 June 1852
An Act for the Regulation and Management of the Charity founded by Thomas Howell in or about the Year One thousand five hundred and forty, and for other Purposes.
Cary Elwes' Estate Act 1852	15 & 16 Vict. c. 15 Pr.	30 June 1852
An Act for enabling the Trustees of the Settlement of Cary Charles Elwes Esquire to grant Building and other Leases of Land, and to make Improvements on the settled Estates in the County of Lincoln, and to purchase Waterworks in the Town of Glamford Briggs.
Earl of Portarlington's Estate Act 1852	15 & 16 Vict. c. 16 Pr.	30 June 1852
An Act for enabling the Trustees of the settled Estates of the Right Honourable Henry John Reuben Earl of Portarlington situate in the County of Dorset to lay out the Monies arising under the Exercise of the Powers of Enfranchisement and Sale and Exchange contained in the Settlement of the same Estates in the Purchase of other Estates in England, Wales, or Ireland, in lieu of being restricted to laying out the same Monies in the Purchase of Estates in England or Wales, as directed by the said Settlement.
Jarvis's Charity Act 1852	15 & 16 Vict. c. 17 Pr.	30 June 1852
An Act for the Regulation of the Charity founded by George Jarvis, for the Benefit of the poor Inhabitants of the several Parishes of Stanton-upon-Wye, Bredwardine, and Letton, all in the County of Hereford; and for other Purposes.
Barker Mill's Estate Act 1852	15 & 16 Vict. c. 18 Pr.	30 June 1852
An Act for enabling Leases, Sales, and Exchanges to be made of the Family Estates in the County of Southampton of the Reverend Sir John Barker Mill Baronet, and for other Purposes, and to be called "Barker Mill's Estate Act, 1852."
Fleming's Estate Act 1852	15 & 16 Vict. c. 19 Pr.	30 June 1852
An Act for enabling Leases, Sales, and Exchanges to be made of the Family Estates, in the Isle of Wight and elsewhere in the County of Southampton, of John Brown Willis Fleming Esquire, and for other Purposes, and of which the Short Title is "Fleming's Estate Act, 1852."
Thornhill's Estate Act 1852	15 & 16 Vict. c. 20 Pr.	30 June 1852
An Act to enable the Infant Tenants in Tail of the Estates in the County of York, subject to the Will of Thomas Thornhill of Fixby in the said County, Esquire, deceased, to grant Building and other Leases of Parts of the said Estates, and to sell or exchange the same, and for other Purposes.
Aberdeen Girls and Boys Hospitals Act 1852	15 & 16 Vict. c. 21 Pr.	30 June 1852
An Act for appointing and incorporating Trustees for the Management of the Boys and Girls Hospitals of Aberdeen as One Institution, and for vesting the Estates and Revenues thereof in such Trustees, and for better managing such Estates and Revenues, and for other Purposes connected therewith.
Hawkins's Divorce Act 1852 (Note: This act was not printed by the Queen's Printer.)	15 & 16 Vict. c. 22 Pr.	30 June 1852
An Act to dissolve the Marriage of Septimus Moore Hawkins Esquire with Harriette Lavinia Hawkins his now Wife, and to enable him to marry again; and for other Purposes.

=== Sources ===
- The Statutes of the United Kingdom of Great Britain and Ireland, 15 & 16 Victoria. 1852. 1852 – via Internet Archive.
- A Collection of the Public General Statutes Passed in the Fifteenth and Sixteenth Year of the Reign of Her Majesty Queen Victoria. London: Eyre and Spottiswoode. 1852 – via Internet Archive.
- The Statutes of the United Kingdom of Great Britain and Ireland. Vol. 23: The Acts 15 & 16 Victoria (1852) and 16 & 17 Victoria (1853). London: Eyre and Spottiswoode. 1853. pp. iii-307 – via Google Books.

== 16 & 17 Vict. ==
The first session of the 16th Parliament of the United Kingdom, which met from 4 November 1852 until 20 August 1853.

=== Public general acts ===
Short title	Citation	Royal assent
Long title
Bills and Notes, Metropolis Act 1852 (repealed)	16 & 17 Vict. c. 1	17 November 1852
An Act to make Provision concerning Bills of Exchange and Promissory Notes payable in the Metropolis on the Day appointed for the Funeral of Arthur late Duke of Wellington. (Repealed by Statute Law Revision Act 1875 (38 & 39 Vict. c. 66))
Bank Notes Act 1852	16 & 17 Vict. c. 2	16 December 1852
An Act to amend an Act of the First Year of King George the Fourth, (Note: Bank Notes Forgery (Scotland) Act 1820 (1 Geo. 4. c. 92)) for the further Prevention of forging and counterfeiting Bank Notes.
Second Annual Inclosure Act 1852 or the Inclosures Act 1852	16 & 17 Vict. c. 3	16 December 1852
An Act to authorize the Inclosure of certain Lands in pursuance of a Special Report of the Inclosure Commissioners for England and Wales.
South American Loans Guarantee Act 1852 (repealed)	16 & 17 Vict. c. 4	16 December 1852
An Act to amend an Act (Note: West Indian Loans Act 1848 (11 & 12 Vict. c. 130)) for guaranteeing the Interest on such Loans, not exceeding Five hundred thousand Pounds, as may be raised by the British Colonies on the Continent of South America, in the West Indies, and the Mauritius, for certain Purposes. (Repealed by Statute Law Revision Act 1875 (38 & 39 Vict. c. 66))

=== Sources ===
- The Statutes of the United Kingdom of Great Britain and Ireland. Vol. 23: The Acts 15 & 16 Victoria (1852) and 16 & 17 Victoria (1853). London: Eyre and Spottiswoode. 1853. pp. 305–952 – via Google Books.
- The Statutes of the United Kingdom of Great Britain and Ireland, 16 & 17 Victoria. 1853. 1853 – via Internet Archive.

== See also ==
- List of acts of the Parliament of the United Kingdom
