= John Bruce Williamson =

John Bruce Williamson KC (1859–1938) was a British barrister and historical author.

== Life ==
Williamson was born on 28 January 1859. The son of John Williamson of Glasgow, he matriculated at Balliol College, Oxford on 29 January 1881, graduating B.A. in 1885.

In 1887 Williamson was called to the bar at the Middle Temple. He was appointed secretary to the University of Durham Commissioners constituted under the University of Durham Act 1908 by warrant under the royal sign manual dated 27 October 1908. He was elected to serve on the General Council of the Bar in February 1911 and again in 1913. He became a bencher of the Middle Temple in 1925.

Williamson died on 7 July 1938. The National Portrait Gallery has a photograph of him taken in 1936 by Olive Edis.

== Works ==
Williamson was the author of:

- The Foreign Commerce of England Under the Tudors: The Stanhope Essay for 1883 (B H Blackwell, Oxford, 1883)
- The Law of Licensing in England (1st Ed: 1898, 2nd Ed: 1902, 3rd Ed: 1905, 4th Ed: 1911). Sometimes called Williamson's Law of Licensing. The first three editions were published by William Clowes & Sons Limited, the fourth was published by Stevens & Sons (Limited). The "standard book" of its day on its subject.
- The Palatine Court of Durham Act, 1889 (Beavis, Stewart & Co; Newcastle; 1890) Also called Bruce Williamson on Palatine Court.
- Memorials of John Bruce, Schoolmaster in Newcastle upon Tyne and of Mary Bruce, His Wife (Newcastle, 1903) (a.k.a. Memorials of John and Mary Bruce; Memorials of John Bruce)
- The History of the Temple, London, from the institution of the order of the Knights of the Temple to the close of the Stuart period (J Murray, London, 1st Ed: 1924, 2nd Ed: 1925; both editions reprinted by Gaunt, Holmes Beach, 1998) Baker calls this book "excellent"
- Roll of Honour (1925)
- Drawings of the Inns of Court and Chancery made probably in the first half of the Eighteenth Century (London Topographical Society, Publication No 59, 1928)
- Middle Temple Hall: Notes upon its History (Printed for Society of the Middle Temple by Chancery Lane Press, London, 1st Ed: 1928, 2nd revised Ed: 1934)
- Catalogue of Silver Plate: The property of the Hon. Society of the Middle Temple (Bonner, London, 1930) Also known as "Silver plate of the Middle Temple", which appears on the cover.
- The Practice of the Law in England (London, 1930)
- Catalogue of the Paintings and Engravings in the Possession of the Hon. Society of the Middle Temple (Society of the Middle Temple, London, 1931)
- Notes on the Middle Temple in the Nineteenth Century, chiefly with reference to the Buildings of the Inn (Bonner & Co, London, 1936)
- Sir Walter Raleigh and His Trial (Pitman, London, 1936) Autumn Reader of the Middle Temple (Lector Autumnalis) for 1935.
- Volume 1 of the Second Edition of "The Middle Temple Bench Book" (1937)

Williamson was joint author with Roger William Wallace QC of:

- The Law and Practice Relating to Letters Patent for Inventions (Wallace and Williams on Patents for Inventions) (W Clowes and Sons Limited, 1900) Reprinted in "nineteenth century legal treatises" microform series by Research Publications, Woodbridge.
