= Trustee Act 1893 =

Act of the Parliament of the United Kingdom

Trustee Act 1893 (Note: Section 53.)
- Act of Parliament
- Parliament of the United Kingdom
- Long title: An Act to consolidate Enactments relating to Trustees.
- Citation: 56 & 57 Vict. c. 53
- Territorial extent: England and Wales; Ireland; (Note: Section 52.)

Dates
- Royal assent: 22 September 1893
- Commencement: 1 January 1894 (Note: Section 54.)
- Repealed: England and Wales: 1 January 1926
Other legislation
Amends	See § Repealed enactments
Repeals/revokes	See § Repealed enactments
Amended by	Trustee Act 1893, Amendment Act 1894; Law of Property Act 1922; Law of Property (Amendment) Act 1924; Law of Property Act 1925; Isle of Man Act 1958
Repealed by	England and Wales: Trustee Act 1925
Relates to	Trusts (Scotland) Act 1921

Status: Repealed

Text of statute as originally enacted

The Trustee Act 1893 (56 & 57 Vict. c. 53) was an act of the Parliament of the United Kingdom that consolidated enactments relating to trustees in England and Wales and Ireland.

== Provisions ==
=== Repealed enactments ===
Section 51 of the act repealed 33 enactments, listed in the schedule to the act.

Citation	Short title	Description	Extent of repeal
36 Geo. 3. c. 52	Legacy Duty Act 1796	The Legacy Duty Act, 1796.	Section thirty-two.
9 & 10 Vict. c. 101	Public Money Drainage Act 1846	The Public Money Drainage Act, 1846.	Section thirty-seven.
10 & 11 Vict. c. 32	Landed Property Improvement (Ireland) Act 1847	The Landed PropertyImprovement (Ireland) Act, 1847.	Section fifty-three.
10 & 11 Vict. c. 96	Trustees Relief Act 1847	An Act for better securing trust funds, and for the relief of trustees.	The whole act.
11 & 12 Vict. c. 68	Trustees Relief (Ireland) Act 1848	An Act for extending to Ireland an Act passed in the last session of Parliament, entitled "An Act for better securing trust funds, and for the "relief of trustees."	The whole act.
12 & 13 Vict. c. 74	Trustees Relief Act 1849	An Act for the further relief of trustees.	The whole act.
13 & 14 Vict. c. 60	Trustee Act 1850	The Trustee Act, 1850.	Sections seven to nineteen, twenty-two to twenty-five, twenty-nine, thirty-two to thirty-six, forty-six, forty-seven, forty-nine, fifty-four and fifty-five; also the residue of the act except so far as relates to the Court exercising jurisdiction in lunacy in Ireland.
15 & 16 Vict. c. 55	Trustee Act 1852	The Trustee Act, 1852.	Sections one to five, eight, and nine; also the residue of the act except so far as relates to the Court exercising jurisdiction in lunacy in Ireland.
17 & 18 Vict. c. 82	Court of Chancery of Lancaster Act 1854	The Court of Chancery of Lancaster Act, 1854.	Section eleven.
18 & 19 Vict. c. 91	Merchant Shipping Act Amendment Act 1855	The Merchant Shipping Act Amendment Act, 1855.	Section ten, except so far as relates to the Court exercising jurisdiction in lunacy in Ireland.
20 & 21 Vict. c. 60	Irish Bankrupt and Insolvent Act 1857	The Irish Bankrupt and Insolvent Act, 1857.	Section three hundred and twenty-two.
22 & 23 Vict. c. 35	Law of Property Amendment Act 1859	The Law of Property Amendment Act, 1859.	Sections twenty-six, thirty and thirty-one.
23 & 24 Vict. c. 88	Law of Property Amendment Act 1860	The Law of Property Amendment Act, 1860.	Section nine.
25 & 26 Vict. c. 108	Confirmation of Sales, etc., by Trustees Act 1862	An Act to confirm certain sales, exchanges, partitions, and enfranchisements by trnstees and others.	The whole act.
26 & 27 Vict. c. 73	India Stock Certificate Act 1863	An Act to give further facilities to the holders of Indian stock.	Section four.
27 & 28 Vict. c. 114	Improvement of Land Act 1864	The Improvement of Land Act, 1864.	Section sixty so far as it relates to trustees; and section sixty-one.
28 & 29 Vict. c. 78	Mortgage Debenture Act 1865	The Mortgage Debenture Act, 1865.	Section forty.
31 & 32 Vict. c. 40	Partition Act 1868	The Partition Act, 1868.	Section seven.
33 & 34 Vict. c. 71	National Debt Act 1870	The National Debt Act, 1870.	Section twenty-nine.
34 & 35 Vict. c. 27	Debenture Stock Act 1871	The Debenture Stock Act, 1871.	The whole act.
37 & 38 Vict. c. 78	Vendor and Purchaser Act 1874	The Vendor and Purchaser Act, 1874.	Sections three and six.
38 & 39 Vict. c. 83	Local Loans Act 1875	The Local Loans Act, 1875.	Sections twenty-one and twenty-seven.
40 & 41 Vict. c. 59	Colonial Stock Act 1877	The Colonial Stock Act. 1877.	Section twelve.
43 & 44 Vict. c. 8	Isle of Man Loans Act 1880	The Isle of Man Loans Act, 1880.	Section seven, so far as it relates to trustees.
44 & 45 Vict. c. 41	Conveyancing Act 1881	The Conveyancing and Law of Property Act, 1881.	Sections thirty-one to thirty-eight.
45 & 46 Vict. c. 39	Conveyancing Act 1882	The Conveyancing Act, 1882.	Section five.
46 & 47 Vict. c. 52	Bankruptcy Act 1883	The Bankruptcy Act, 1883.	Section one hundred and forty-seven.
51 & 52 Vict. c. 59	Trustee Act 1888	The Trustee Act. 1888	The whole act, except sections one and eight.
52 & 53 Vict. c. 32	Trust Investment Act 1889	The Trust Investment Act, 1889.	The whole act, except sections one and seven.
52 & 53 Vict. c. 47	Palatine Court of Durham Act 1889	The Palatine Court of Durham Act, 1889.	Section eight.
53 & 54 Vict. c. 5	Lunacy Act 1890	The Lunacy Act, 1890.	Section one hundred and forty.
53 & 54 Vict. c. 69	Settled Land Act 1890	The Settled Land Act. 1890.	Section seventeen.
55 & 56 Vict. c. 13	Conveyancing and Law of Property Act 1892	The Conveyancing and Law of Property Act, 1892.	Section six.

== Subsequent developments ==
Section 44 of the act was repealed by section 207 of, and the seventh schedule to, the Law of Property Act 1925 (15 & 16 Geo. 5. c. 20).

The whole act was repealed by section 70 of, and the second schedule to, the Trustee Act 1925 (15 & 16 Geo. 5. c. 19), which came into operation on 1 January 1926.
