= Trustee Act 1850 =

Act of the Parliament of the United Kingdom

Trustee Act 1850 (Note: Section 58.)
- Act of Parliament
- Parliament of the United Kingdom
- Long title: An Act to consolidate and amend the Laws relating to the Conveyance and Transfer of Real and Personal Property vested in Mortgagees and Trustees.
- Citation: 13 & 14 Vict. c. 60
- Territorial extent: England and Wales; Ireland; (Note: Sections 54–57.)

Dates
- Royal assent: 5 August 1850
- Commencement: 1 November 1850 (Note: Section 59.)
- Repealed: England and Wales: 25 August 1894; Northern Ireland: 31 July 1986
Other legislation
Repeals/revokes	See § Repealed enactments
Repealed by	Statute Law Revision Act 1875; Lunacy Act 1890; Statute Law Revision Act 1891Trustee Act 1893; Statute Law Revision Act 1894

Status: Repealed

Text of statute as originally enacted

The Trustee Act 1850 (13 & 14 Vict. c. 60) was an act of the Parliament of the United Kingdom that consolidated and amended the law relating to the conveyance and transfer of real and personal property vested in trustees and mortgagees in England and Wales and Ireland.

== Provisions ==
=== Repealed enactments ===
Section 1 of the act repealed 3 enactments, listed in that section. The repeal did not affect any proceedings already commenced under the repealed acts, which could be continued under those acts or under the provisions of this act; the acts which the repealed acts had themselves repealed were not revived; and the repeal took effect only when this act came into operation.

Citation	Short title	Description	Extent of repeal
11 Geo. 4 & 1 Will. 4. c. 60	Transfer of Trust Estates Act 1830	An Act for amending the Laws respecting Conveyances and Transfers of Estates and Funds vested in Trustees and Mortgagees, and for enabling Courts of Equity to give Effect to their Decrees and Orders in certain Cases.	The whole act.
4 & 5 Will. 4. c. 23	Trust Property Escheat Act 1834	An Act for the Amendment of the Law relative to the Escheat and Forfeiture of Real and Personal Property holden in Trust.	The whole act.
1 & 2 Vict. c. 69	Estates Vest in Heirs, etc., of Mortgages Act 1838	An Act to remove Doubts respecting Conveyances of Estates vested in Heirs and Devisees of Mortgagees.	The whole act.

== Subsequent developments ==
Sections 1, 38, and 39, the words "Motion or" (wherever they occur) in section 41, the words "Motion or" (wherever they occur) and the words "Certificate or" in section 42, and sections 50, 59, and 60, of the act were repealed by section 1 of, and the schedule to, the Statute Law Revision Act 1875 (38 & 39 Vict. c. 66), which came into force on 11 August 1875.

Sections 3, 4, 5, 6, and 56, and sections 20, 26, 27, 28, 31, 40, 41, 42, 44, 45, 51, 52, and 53,, so far as they relate to "the Lord Chancellor entrusted as aforesaid.", were repealed except for Ireland by section 5 of, and the fifth schedule to, the Lunacy Act 1890 (53 & 54 Vict. c. 5), which came into force on 1 May 1890.

The preamble, section 2 to “declared that.”, the words “And be it enacted, that” wherever they occur, the words “the Governor and Company of” wherever they occur in section 20, section 21, so far as it relates to the Court of Chancery of the County Palatine of Lancaster, the word “that” before “an order.” in section 37 and the words “her heirs or successors.” in section 36, were repealed by section 1 of, and the first schedule to, the Statute Law Revision Act 1891 (54 & 55 Vict. c. 67), which came into force on 5 August 1891.

Sections 7–19, 22–25, 29, 32–36, 46, 47, 49, 54 and 55 of the act, and the residue of the act except in so far as it relates to the court exercising jurisdiction in lunacy in Ireland, were repealed by section 51 of, and the schedule to, the Trustee Act 1893 (56 & 57 Vict. c. 53), which came into force on 1 January 1894.

The following enactments were repealed by section 1 of, and the first schedule to, the Statute Law Revision Act 1894 (57 & 58 Vict. c. 54), which came into force on 25 August 1894.

- Section 2, from “and including also surrenders” to “copyhold lands” where those words last occur, from “Great Britain as any” to “Lord Chancellor of” where those words last occur, and from “The word devisee” to “and descent.”
- The words “or the Court of Chancery” wherever they occur in sections 20, 26, 30, 31, and 45.
- Section 20, the words “born or unborn” and “as the case may be.”
- Section 26, the words “or of the Court of Chancery.”
- Section 27, the words “or by the Court of Chancery.”
- Section 28.
- Section 30, the words “as the case may be” “the said Court or” and “born or unborn.”
- Section 37, the words “for the appointment of a new trustee or trustees or.”
- Section 40, the words “from the said Court of Chancery or” “to the Court of Chancery or” and “the said Court or.”
- Section 41, the words “for the said Court or “occurring twice, and “before the said Court or.”
- Section 42, the words “the Court or.”
- Sections 43 and 44.
- Section 45, the word “said” where it first occurs.
- Section 51, the words “and the Court of Chancery” and “or Court.”
- Section 53, the words “or to the Court of Chancery” and “or the said Court of Chancery.”
- Section 56.
- Section 57, the words “of Great Britain” and from “in like manner” to “as aforesaid.”

The whole act, so far as unrepealed, was repealed by article 138 of, and schedule 7 to, the Mental Health (Northern Ireland) Order 1986 (SI 1986/595), which came into force on 31 July 1986.
