= 1836 in the United Kingdom =

Events from the year 1836 in the United Kingdom.

== Incumbents ==
- Monarch – William IV
- Prime Minister – William Lamb, 2nd Viscount Melbourne (Whig)
- Foreign Secretary – Henry John Temple, 3rd Viscount Palmerston
- Home Secretary – Lord John Russell

== Events ==
- 3 February – A new fourpence coin (groat or "joey") is declared legal tender prior to its first minting since 1800.
- 8 February
  - The London and Greenwich Railway opens its first section, the first railway in London.
  - Commencement of Hampden Controversy: Lord Melbourne's appointment of Renn Dickson Hampden (a supporter of toleration for Dissenters) as Regius Professor of Divinity in the University of Oxford splits the Church of England into high church and liberal factions.
- 29 February – The first running of what would become known as the Grand National Steeplechase takes place at Aintree Racecourse, near Liverpool, and is won by The Duke.
- 2 March – First organised point-to-point horse race held, at Madresfield, Worcester.
- 23 April – The workhouse at Heckingham, Norfolk, becomes the first of several to suffer an arson attack in protest at the imposition of more restrictive conditions for the inmates under the Poor Law Amendment Act 1834.
- 23 May – Irish Constabulary Act provides central organisation for the police in Ireland.
- June
  - Legal & General formed as the New Law Life Assurance Society by London lawyers.
  - Origin of Belle Vue Zoological Gardens in Manchester.
- 7 June – Huddersfield Choral Society formed.
- 9 June – London Working Men's Association founded; later a centre for Chartism.
- 5 July – Main provisions of the Durham (County Palatine) Act 1836 (passed 21 June) come into effect: the previous secular jurisdiction of the Prince-bishop of Durham over the County Palatine of Durham is vested in the Crown and the Court of the County of Durham is abolished; an Act of 17 August also removes secular jurisdictions of the Archbishop of York and Bishop of Ely.
- 13 August
  - Tithe Commutation Act replaces the ancient system of payment of tithes in kind with monetary payments.
  - Last hanging for robbery, Lawrence Curtis at Shrewsbury.
- 15 August – Liverpool Lime Street railway station opens in the centre of Liverpool, the first grand terminus building in the world, replacing the smaller Crown Street station and accessed via a long railway tunnel from Edge Hill in the east of the city.
- 17 August – Marriage Act establishes civil marriage and registration systems that permit marriages in nonconformist chapels, and a Registrar General of Births, Marriages, and Deaths.
- 20 August – An Act for enabling Persons indicted of Felony to make their Defence by Counsel or Attorney ("Prisoner's Counsel" or "Trial for Felonies" Act) requires provision of defence counsel for those charged with serious crimes (coming into force 1 October); also passing of an Act to prevent the Fact of a previous Conviction being given in Evidence to the Jury on the Case before them.
- 22 August – Midland Bank established in Birmingham as the Birmingham and Midland Bank.
- 31 August – Last hanging for arson, Daniel Case at Ilchester.
- 2 October – Naturalist Charles Darwin returns to Falmouth, Cornwall, aboard HMS Beagle after a 5-year journey collecting biological data he will later use to develop his theory of evolution.
- 15 October – First bishop nominated to the Diocese of Ripon, the first new diocese since establishment of the Church of England.
- 28 November – University of London founded.
- 14 December – The London and Greenwich Railway opens throughout from London Bridge to Deptford.
- 27 December – Lewes avalanche in East Sussex kills eight.
- Undated – R v Pritchard decided in the Exchequer of Pleas, a leading case in English law on determining a defendant's fitness to plead.

== Publications ==
- Charles Dickens' first novel The Pickwick Papers ("The Posthumous Papers of the Pickwick Club..., edited by Boz"; first monthly part dated March).
- Frederick Marryat's anonymous novel Mr Midshipman Easy.
- A. W. N. Pugin's treatise on the morality of Catholic Gothic architecture Contrasts

== Births ==
- 16 February – Robert Halpin, mariner and cable layer (died 1894)
- 8 March – Harriet Samuel, businesswoman, founder of jewellery retailer H. Samuel (died 1908)
- 12 March – Isabella Beeton, journalist, writer on cookery and household management (died 1865)
- 13 March – Peter Graham, artist (died 1921)
- 24 May – Joseph Rowntree, chocolate manufacturer and Quaker philanthropist (died 1925)
- 9 June – Elizabeth Garrett Anderson, doctor and suffragist (died 1917)
- 8 July – Joseph Chamberlain, politician (died 1914)
- 7 September – Henry Campbell-Bannerman, Prime Minister of the United Kingdom (died 1908)
- 26 September – Thomas Crapper, plumber, inventor (died 1910)
- 27 October – Thomas Gwyn Elger, astronomer (died 1897)
- 18 November – W. S. Gilbert, dramatist (died 1911)
- 22 November – George Barham, businessman, founder of Express County Milk Supply Company (died 1913)
- 7 December – John Wolfe Barry, architect and civil engineer (died 1918)

== Deaths ==
- 21 January – Jack Small, cricketer (born 1765)
- 28 January – William Scott, 1st Baron Stowell, judge (born 1745)
- 31 January – John Cheyne, physician (born 1777)
- 1 February – John By, military engineer (born 1779)
- 4 February – Sir William Gell, archaeologist (born 1777)
- 5 February – Dorothy Kilner, children's author (born 1755)
- 15 February – John Gillies, historian and classical scholar (born 1747)
- 21 February – William Van Mildert, last Prince-bishop of Durham and founder of Durham University (born 1765)
- 22 February – John Clarke Whitfield, organist and composer (born 1770)
- 27 February – Elizabeth Whitlock, actress (born 1761)
- 14 March – John Mayne, Scottish-born poet (born 1759)
- 31 March – Edward Southwell Ruthven, Irish politician and MP (born c. 1772)
- 3 April – Jeremy Lister, British Army officer (born 1752)
- 7 April – William Godwin, journalist, political philosopher and novelist (born 1756)
- 20 April – Jemmy Wood, banker and miser, "the richest commoner in His Majesty's dominions" (born 1756)
- 13 May – Sir Charles Wilkins, orientalist and typographer (born 1749)
- 28 May – George Gordon, 5th Duke of Gordon, nobleman, soldier and politician (born 1770)
- 7 June – Nathan Drake, essayist and physician (born 1766)
- 23 June – James Mill, historian, economist, political theorist, and philosopher (born 1773)
- June – Cesar Picton, slave turned businessman (born c. 1755 in Senegal)
- 18 July – James Henry Keith Stewart, Member of Parliament (born 1783)
- 28 July – Nathan Mayer Rothschild, financier (born 1777 in Frankfurt am Main)
- 20 August – Agnes Bulmer, poet (born 1775)
- 21 August
  - Edward Turner Bennett, zoologist and writer (born 1797)
  - William Cusac Smith, Baronet, judge (born 1766)
- 25 August – William Elford Leach, zoologist and marine biologist (born 1791)
- September – Theresa Berkley, dominatrix and brothel keeper (year of birth unknown)
- 2 September – William Henry, chemist (born 1775)
- 3 September – Daniel Mendoza, boxer (born 1764)
- 6 September – Louisa Gurney Hoare, diarist and writer on education (born 1784)
- 7 September – John Pond, astronomer (born 1767)
- 21 September – John Stafford Smith, composer, church organist and early musicologist (born 1750)
- 3 October – James Blaikie, Lord Provost of Aberdeen (born 1786)
- 6 October – William Marsden, orientalist (born 1754)
- 11 October – William Knighton, Private Secretary to the Sovereign (born 1776)
- 17 October – George Colman the Younger, dramatist (born 1762)
- 31 October – John Marshall, politician (born 1797)
- 13 November – Charles Simeon, clergyman (born 1759)
- 26 November – John Loudon McAdam, engineer and road-builder (born 1756)
- 4 December – Richard Westall, painter (born 1765)
- 17 December – John Rippon, Baptist minister (born 1751)
- 30 December – James Graham, 3rd Duke of Montrose, nobleman and statesman (born 1755)

=== Unknown dates ===
- William Dawes, Royal Marine officer (born 1762; died in Antigua)
- Thomas Minton, potter (born 1765)
