= List of acts of the Parliament of the United Kingdom from 1858 =

This is a complete list of acts of the Parliament of the United Kingdom for the year 1858.

Note that the first parliament of the United Kingdom was held in 1801; parliaments between 1707 and 1800 were either parliaments of Great Britain or of Ireland). For acts passed up until 1707, see the list of acts of the Parliament of England and the list of acts of the Parliament of Scotland. For acts passed from 1707 to 1800, see the list of acts of the Parliament of Great Britain. See also the list of acts of the Parliament of Ireland.

For acts of the devolved parliaments and assemblies in the United Kingdom, see the list of acts of the Scottish Parliament, the list of acts of the Northern Ireland Assembly, and the list of acts and measures of Senedd Cymru; see also the list of acts of the Parliament of Northern Ireland.

The number shown after each act's title is its chapter number. Acts passed before 1963 are cited using this number, preceded by the year(s) of the reign during which the relevant parliamentary session was held; thus the Union with Ireland Act 1800 is cited as "39 & 40 Geo. 3 c. 67", meaning the 67th act passed during the session that started in the 39th year of the reign of George III and which finished in the 40th year of that reign. Note that the modern convention is to use Arabic numerals in citations (thus "41 Geo. 3" rather than "41 Geo. III"). Acts of the last session of the Parliament of Great Britain and the first session of the Parliament of the United Kingdom are both cited as "41 Geo. 3".

Some of these acts have a short title. Some of these acts have never had a short title. Some of these acts have a short title given to them by later acts, such as by the Short Titles Act 1896.

== 21 & 22 Vict. ==
Continuing the second session of the 17th Parliament of the United Kingdom, which met from 3 December 1857 until 2 August 1858.

=== Public general acts ===
| Short title | Citation | Royal assent |
Long title
| Annuity (Lady of Havelock) Act 1858 (repealed) | 21 & 22 Vict. c. 2 | 22 March 1858 |
An Act to settle Annuities on Lady Havelock and Sir Henry Marshman Havelock, in consideration of the eminent Services of the late Major General Havelock. (Repealed by Statute Law Revision Act 1953 (2 & 3 Eliz. 2. c. 5))
| East India Loans Act 1858 (repealed) | 21 & 22 Vict. c. 3 | 22 March 1858 |
An Act for enabling the East India Company to raise Money in the United Kingdom for the Service of the Government of India. (Repealed by East India Loans Act 1937 (1 Edw. 8 & 1 Geo. 6. c. 14))
| Militia Act 1858 (repealed) | 21 & 22 Vict. c. 4 | 25 March 1858 |
An Act to continue an Act of the last Session (Note: Militia Embodiment Act 1857 (20 & 21 Vict. c. 82)) to authorize the embodying of the Militia. (Repealed by Statute Law Revision Act 1875 (38 & 39 Vict. c. 66))
| Supply Act 1858 (repealed) | 21 & 22 Vict. c. 5 | 26 March 1858 |
An Act to apply the Sum of Ten Millions out of the Consolidated Fund to the Service of the Year One thousand eight hundred and fifty-eight. (Repealed by Statute Law Revision Act 1875 (38 & 39 Vict. c. 66))
| Supply (No. 2) Act 1858 (repealed) | 21 & 22 Vict. c. 6 | 26 March 1858 |
An Act to apply the Sum of Five hundred thousand Pounds out of the Consolidated Fund to the Service of the Year ending the Thirty-first Day of March One thousand eight hundred and fifty-eight. (Repealed by Statute Law Revision Act 1875 (38 & 39 Vict. c. 66))
| Marine Mutiny Act 1858 (repealed) | 21 & 22 Vict. c. 7 | 26 March 1858 |
An Act for the Regulation of Her Majesty's Royal Marine Forces while on shore. (Repealed by Statute Law Revision Act 1875 (38 & 39 Vict. c. 66))
| Annual Inclosure Act 1858 or the Inclosures Act 1858 | 21 & 22 Vict. c. 8 | 26 March 1858 |
An Act to authorize the Inclosure of certain Lands in pursuance of a Report of the Inclosure Commissioners for England and Wales.
| Mutiny Act 1858 (repealed) | 21 & 22 Vict. c. 9 | 26 March 1858 |
An Act for punishing Mutiny and Desertion, and for the better Payment of the Army and their Quarters. (Repealed by Statute Law Revision Act 1875 (38 & 39 Vict. c. 66))
| Public Health Supplemental Act 1858 | 21 & 22 Vict. c. 10 | 11 May 1858 |
An Act to confirm a certain Provisional Order of the General Board of Health, applying the Public Health Act, 1848, (Note: Public Health Act 1848 (11 & 12 Vict. c. 63)) to the District of Skipton in the West Riding of the County of York; and to further declare the Limits of the District of Toxteth Park in the County Palatine of Lancaster, for the Purposes of the said Act.
| | Provisional Order for the Application of the Public Health Act to the District of Shipton in the West Riding of the County of York. | |
| Cambridge University Act 1858 (repealed) | 21 & 22 Vict. c. 11 | 11 May 1858 |
An Act to repeal the Stamp Duties payable on Matriculation and Degrees in the University of Cambridge. (Repealed by Statute Law Revision Act 1963 (c. 30))
| Customs Duties Act 1858 or the Customs Act 1858 (repealed) | 21 & 22 Vict. c. 12 | 11 May 1858 |
An Act for the Alteration of certain Duties of Customs. (Repealed by Statute Law Revision Act 1875 (38 & 39 Vict. c. 66))
| Exchequer Bills Act 1858 (repealed) | 21 & 22 Vict. c. 13 | 11 May 1858 |
An Act for raising the Sum of Twenty million nine hundred and eleven thousand five hundred Pounds by Exchequer Bills, for the Service of the Year One thousand eight hundred and fifty-eight. (Repealed by Statute Law Revision Act 1875 (38 & 39 Vict. c. 66))
| Exchequer Bonds Act 1858 (repealed) | 21 & 22 Vict. c. 14 | 11 May 1858 |
An Act for raising the Sum of Two Millions by Exchequer Bonds. (Repealed by Statute Law Revision Act 1875 (38 & 39 Vict. c. 66))
| Excise Act 1858 (repealed) | 21 & 22 Vict. c. 15 | 11 May 1858 |
An Act for granting certain additional Rates and Duties of Excise. (Repealed by Statute Law Revision Act 1875 (38 & 39 Vict. c. 66))
| Customs Act 1858 (repealed) | 21 & 22 Vict. c. 16 | 11 May 1858 |
An Act for the further Amendment of the Duties of Customs. (Repealed by Statute Law Revision Act 1875 (38 & 39 Vict. c. 66))
| Supply (No. 3) Act 1858 (repealed) | 21 & 22 Vict. c. 17 | 21 May 1858 |
An Act to apply the Sum of Eleven Millions out of the Consolidated Fund to the Service of the Year One thousand eight hundred and fifty-eight. (Repealed by Statute Law Revision Act 1875 (38 & 39 Vict. c. 66))
| Chelsea Hospital Act 1858 | 21 & 22 Vict. c. 18 | 21 May 1858 |
An Act to effect an Exchange between the Commissioners of Chelsea Hospital and the Governor and Company of Chelsea Waterworks of Lands in the Parishes of Saint George Hanover Square and Saint Margaret Westminster in the County of Middlesex.
| Loan Societies Act 1858 (repealed) | 21 & 22 Vict. c. 19 | 21 May 1858 |
An Act to continue an Act of the Third and Fourth Years of Her Majesty, Chapter One hundred and ten, (Note: Loan Societies Act 1840 (3 & 4 Vict. c. 110)) to amend the Laws relating to Loan Societies. (Repealed by Loan Act 1863 (26 & 27 Vict. c. 56))
| Stamps Act 1858 (repealed) | 21 & 22 Vict. c. 20 | 21 May 1858 |
An Act for granting a Stamp Duty on certain Drafts or Orders for the Payment of Money. (Repealed by Inland Revenue Repeal Act 1870 (33 & 34 Vict. c. 99))
| Chelsea Hospital Purchase Act 1858 | 21 & 22 Vict. c. 21 | 14 June 1858 |
An Act to confirm a Contract for the Sale by the Commissioners of Her Majesty's Works of certain Lands to the Commissioners of Chelsea Hospital.
| Franchise Prisons Abolition Act 1858 (repealed) | 21 & 22 Vict. c. 22 | 14 June 1858 |
An Act to abolish Franchise Prisons. (Repealed by Statute Law Revision Act 1892 (55 & 56 Vict. c. 19))
| Portumna Bridge Act 1858 | 21 & 22 Vict. c. 23 | 14 June 1858 |
An Act for abolishing the Tolls now levied on the Bridge over the Shannon at Portumna in Ireland.
| Stamps (No. 2) Act 1858 (repealed) | 21 & 22 Vict. c. 24 | 14 June 1858 |
An Act to reduce the Stamp Duty on Passports. (Repealed by Inland Revenue Repeal Act 1870 (33 & 34 Vict. c. 99))
| Births and Deaths Registration Act 1858 (repealed) | 21 & 22 Vict. c. 25 | 14 June 1858 |
An Act to amend the Act (Note: Non-parochial Registers Act 1840 (3 & 4 Vict. c. 92)) concerning Non-parochial Registers, and the Acts for Marriages, and for registering Births, Deaths, and Marriages, in England, and concerning Vaccination. (Repealed by Statute Law (Repeals) Act 2004 (c. 14))
| Property Qualification for Members of Parliament Act 1858 (repealed) | 21 & 22 Vict. c. 26 | 28 June 1858 |
An Act to abolish the Property Qualifications of Members of Parliament. (Repealed by Statute Law Revision Act 1875 (38 & 39 Vict. c. 66))
| Chancery Amendment Act 1858 or Lord Cairns' Act (repealed) | 21 & 22 Vict. c. 27 | 28 June 1858 |
An Act to amend the course of procedure in the High Court of Chancery, the Court of Chancery in Ireland, and the Court of Chancery of the county palatine of Lancaster. (Repealed for England and Wales by Statute Law Revision and Civil Procedure Act 1883 (46 & 47 Vict. c. 49) and Senior Courts Act 1981 (c. 54) and for Northern Ireland by Judicature (Northern Ireland) Act 1978 (c. 23))
| Peace Preservation (Ireland) Act 1858 (repealed) | 21 & 22 Vict. c. 28 | 28 June 1858 |
An Act to continue the Peace Preservation (Ireland) Act, 1856. (Note: Peace Preservation (Ireland) Act 1856 (19 & 20 Vict. c. 36)) (Repealed by Statute Law Revision Act 1875 (38 & 39 Vict. c. 66))
| Harvey's Charity, Folkestone Act 1858 | 21 & 22 Vict. c. 29 | 28 June 1858 |
An Act for confirming a Scheme of the Charity Commissioners for Sir Eliab Harvey's Charity in the Town of Folkestone.
| | Scheme for the Administration of the Charity called "Sir Eliab Habvet's Charity," at Folkestone, in the County of Kent. | |
| Bristol Charities Act 1858 | 21 & 22 Vict. c. 30 | 28 June 1858 |
An Act for confirming a Scheme of the Charity Commissioners for certain Municipal Charities in the City of Bristol.
| | Scheme for the Application of certain Accumulated Funds and Surplus Income belonging to the following Charities in the City of Bristol now under the Administration of the Trustees of the Municipal Charities of that City, viz.:— Dr. Thomas White's Road Money and Loan Charities, Mary Ann Peloquin's Charity, George Harrington's Charity, Alderman Joseph Jackson's Charity, Sir Abraham Elton's Charity, Mrs. Anne Snigge's Exhibition Charity, George White's Exhibition Charity, and Robert Kitchen's Charity. | |
| Bristol Charities (No. 2) Act 1858 (repealed) | 21 & 22 Vict. c. 31 | 28 June 1858 |
An Act for confirming a Scheme of the Charity Commissioners for certain Charities in the Parishes of Saint Nicholas and Saint Leonard in the City of Bristol. (Repealed by Statute Law (Repeals) Act 1981 (c. 19))
| | Scheme for the Administration and Management of the several Charities in the Parishes of Saint Nicholas and Saint Leonard, in the City of Bristol, herein-after mentioned or referred to. | |
| Validation of Acts of Late Chief Justice of Bombay Act 1858 (repealed) | 21 & 22 Vict. c. 32 | 12 July 1858 |
An Act to make valid certain Acts of the late Chief Justice of Bombay. (Repealed by Statute Law Revision Act 1875 (38 & 39 Vict. c. 66))
| County Rates (England) Act 1858 (repealed) | 21 & 22 Vict. c. 33 | 12 July 1858 |
An Act for the better Management of County Rates. (Repealed by Statute Law Revision Act 1892 (55 & 56 Vict. c. 19))
| Railways (Ireland) Act 1858 (repealed) | 21 & 22 Vict. c. 34 | 12 July 1858 |
An Act to continue "The Railways Act (Ireland), 1851." (Note: Railways Act (Ireland) 1851 (14 & 15 Vict. c. 70)) (Repealed by Statute Law Revision Act 1875 (38 & 39 Vict. c. 66))
| Portendic and Albreda Convention Act 1858 (repealed) | 21 & 22 Vict. c. 35 | 12 July 1858 |
An Act to remove Doubts as to the Operation of a Convention between Her Majesty and the Emperor of the French relative to Portendic and Albreda. (Repealed by Statute Law Revision Act 1963 (c. 30))
| Lands of the Commissioners for the Exhibition of 1851 Act 1858 (repealed) | 21 & 22 Vict. c. 36 | 12 July 1858 |
An Act for releasing the Lands of the Commissioners for the Exhibition of 1851, upon the Repayment of Monies granted in aid of their Funds. (Repealed by Statute Law (Repeals) Act 1978 (c. 45))
| Hainault Forest (Allotment of Commons) Act 1858 (repealed) | 21 & 22 Vict. c. 37 | 23 July 1858 |
An Act to provide for the Allotment of the Commonable Lands within the Boundaries of the late Forest of Hainault in the County of Essex. (Repealed by Wild Creatures and Forest Laws Act 1971 (c. 47))
| Reduction of National Debt Act 1858 (repealed) | 21 & 22 Vict. c. 38 | 23 July 1858 |
An Act to repeal certain Provisions for the Issue out of the Consolidated Fund of fixed Amounts for the Reduction of the Funded Debt. (Repealed by Statute Law Revision Act 1875 (38 & 39 Vict. c. 66))
| Militia Ballot Suspension Act 1858 (repealed) | 21 & 22 Vict. c. 39 | 23 July 1858 |
An Act to suspend the making of Lists and the Ballots for the Militia of the United Kingdom. (Repealed by Statute Law Revision Act 1875 (38 & 39 Vict. c. 66))
| New General Post Office, Edinburgh, Act 1858 (repealed) | 21 & 22 Vict. c. 40 | 23 July 1858 |
An Act to confer Powers on the Commissioners of Her Majesty's Works and Public Buildings to acquire the Theatre Royal, Edinburgh, and adjacent Property, for the Erection of a new General Post Office, and for other Purposes. (Repealed by Post Office Act 1969 (c. 48))
| Navigations (Ireland) Act 1858 (repealed) | 21 & 22 Vict. c. 41 | 23 July 1858 |
An Act to extend the lime for making Advances towards Navigations in Ireland, under the Provisions of an Act of the Nineteenth and Twentieth Victoria, Chapter Sixty-two. (Note: Drainage (Ireland) Act 1856 (19 & 20 Vict. c. 62)) (Repealed by Statute Law Revision Act 1875 (38 & 39 Vict. c. 66))
| Prescription (Ireland) Act 1858 | 21 & 22 Vict. c. 42 | 23 July 1858 |
An Act for shortening the Time of Prescription in certain Cases in Ireland.
| Municipal Franchise Act 1858 (repealed) | 21 & 22 Vict. c. 43 | 23 July 1858 |
An Act to amend the Municipal Franchise in certain Cases. (Repealed by Municipal Corporations Act 1882 (45 & 46 Vict. c. 50))
| Universities and College Estates Act 1858 (repealed) | 21 & 22 Vict. c. 44 | 23 July 1858 |
An Act to give to the Universities of Oxford, Cambridge, and Durham, and the Colleges in those Universities, and to the Colleges of Saint Mary of Winchester near Winchester, and of King Henry the Sixth at Eton, Power to sell, enfranchise, and exchange Lauds, under certain Conditions, and also to grant Leases for Agricultural, Building, and Mining Purposes, and to deal with the Interests of their Lessees, under proper Reservations and Restrictions. (Repealed by Universities and College Estates Act 1925 (15 & 16 Geo. 5. c. 24))
| Durham County Palatine Act 1858 | 21 & 22 Vict. c. 45 | 23 July 1858 |
An Act to amend the Provisions of an Act of the Sixth Year of King William the Fourth, (Note: Durham (County Palatine) Act 1836 (6 & 7 Will. 4. c. 19)) for separating the Palatine Jurisdiction of the County Palatine of Durham from the Bishoprick of Durham; and to make further Provision with respect to the Jura Regalia of the said County.
| Confirmation of Certain Marriages Act 1858 (repealed) | 21 & 22 Vict. c. 46 | 23 July 1858 |
An Act to remove Doubts as to the Validity of certain Marriages of British Subjects abroad. (Repealed by Foreign Marriage (Amendment) Act 1988 (c. 44))
| Law of False Pretences Act 1858 (repealed) | 21 & 22 Vict. c. 47 | 23 July 1858 |
An Act to amend the Law of False Pretences. (Repealed by Statute Law Revision Act 1892 (55 & 56 Vict. c. 19))
| Oaths of Allegiance, etc., and Relief of Jews Act 1858 or the Oaths Act 1858 (repealed) | 21 & 22 Vict. c. 48 | 23 July 1858 |
An Act to substitute One Oath for the Oaths of Allegiance, Supremacy, and Abjuration; and for the Relief of Her Majesty's Subjects professing the Jewish Religion. (Repealed by Promissory Oaths Act 1871 (34 & 35 Vict. c. 48))
| Jews Relief Act 1858 or the Jewish Disabilities Act 1858 | 21 & 22 Vict. c. 49 | 23 July 1858 |
An Act to provide for the Relief of Her Majesty's Subjects professing the Jewish Religion.
| Ecclesiastical Jurisdiction Act 1858 (repealed) | 21 & 22 Vict. c. 50 | 23 July 1858 |
An Act to continue certain temporary Provisions concerning Ecclesiastical Jurisdiction in England. (Repealed by Statute Law Revision Act 1950 (14 Geo. 6. c. 6))
| Roman Catholic Charities Act 1858 (repealed) | 21 & 22 Vict. c. 51 | 23 July 1858 |
An Act further to continue the Exemption of certain Charities from the Operation of the Charitable Trusts Acts. (Repealed by Statute Law Revision Act 1875 (38 & 39 Vict. c. 66))
| Inferior Courts Officers (Ireland) Act 1858 (repealed) | 21 & 22 Vict. c. 52 | 23 July 1858 |
An Act to appoint a Clerk of Nisi Prius for the Consolidated Nisi Prius Court in Ireland, and to make Provision for the Appointment of Tipstaffs in the Superior Courts of Common Law and Equity in Ireland. (Repealed by Statute Law Revision Act 1958 (6 & 7 Eliz. 2. c. 46))
| Copyhold Commission Act 1858 (repealed) | 21 & 22 Vict. c. 53 | 23 July 1858 |
An Act to continue Appointments under the Act (Note: Inclosure Commissioners Act 1851 (14 & 15 Vict. c. 53)) for consolidating the Copyhold and Inclosure Commissions, ana for completing Proceedings under the Tithe Commutation Acts. (Repealed by Statute Law Revision Act 1875 (38 & 39 Vict. c. 66))
| Indemnity Act 1858 (repealed) | 21 & 22 Vict. c. 54 | 23 July 1858 |
An Act to indemnify such Persons in the United Kingdom as have omitted to qualify themselves for Offices and Employments, and to extend the Time limited for those Purposes respectively. (Repealed by Promissory Oaths Act 1871 (34 & 35 Vict. c. 48))
| Army Enlistment Act 1858 (repealed) | 21 & 22 Vict. c. 55 | 23 July 1858 |
An Act to revive and continue an Act (Note: Army Enlistment Act 1855 (18 & 19 Vict. c. 4)) amending the Act (Note: Time of Service in the Army Act 1847 (10 & 11 Vict. c. 37)) for limiting the Time of Service in the Army. (Repealed by Statute Law Revision Act 1875 (38 & 39 Vict. c. 66))
| Confirmation of Executors (Scotland) Act 1858 | 21 & 22 Vict. c. 56 | 23 July 1858 |
An Act to amend the Law relating to the Confirmation of Executors in Scotland, and to extend over all parts of the United Kingdom the effect of such Confirmation, and of Grants of Probate and Administration.
| Ecclesiastical Leasing Act 1858 (repealed) | 21 & 22 Vict. c. 57 | 23 July 1858 |
An Act to amend the Act of the Fifth and Sixth Years of Her present Majesty, (Note: Ecclesiastical Leasing Act 1842 (5 & 6 Vict. c. 108)) for enabling Ecclesiastical Corporations, aggregate and sole, to grant Leases for long Terms of Years. (Repealed for the Isle of Man by Ecclesiastical Leases (Isle of Man) Act 1866 (29 & 30 Vict. c. 81) and for England by Endowments and Glebe Measure 1976 (No. 4) and Statute Law (Repeals) Measure 2018 (No. 1))
| Stanhope and Wolsingham Rectories Act 1858 | 21 & 22 Vict. c. 58 | 23 July 1858 |
An Act for the future Appropriation of the Tithe or Tenth of Lead Ores in the Parishes of Stanhope and Wolsingham in the County of Durham belonging to the respective Rectors thereof, subject to the existing Incumbencies, and for making other Provisions for the Endowment of the said Rectories in lieu thereof, and for other Purposes connected therewith.
| Church of Ireland Act 1858 | 21 & 22 Vict. c. 59 | 23 July 1858 |
An Act further to amend the Law relating to the Erection and Endowment of Churches, Chapels, and Perpetual Curacies in Ireland.
| Joint Stock Companies Amendment Act 1858 or the Joint Stock Companies Act 1858 (repealed) | 21 & 22 Vict. c. 60 | 23 July 1858 |
An Act to Amend the Joint Stock Companies Acts, 1856 (Note: Joint Stock Companies Act 1856 (19 & 20 Vict. c. 47)) and 1857, (Note: Joint Stock Companies Act 1857 (20 & 21 Vict. c. 14)) and the Joint Stock Banking Companies Act, 1857. (Note: Joint Stock Banking Companies Act 1857 (20 & 21 Vict. c. 49)) (Repealed by Companies Act 1862 (25 & 26 Vict. c. 89))
| Second Annual Inclosure Act 1858 or the Inclosures Act 1858 | 21 & 22 Vict. c. 61 | 2 August 1858 |
An Act to authorize the Inclosure of certain Lands in pursuance of a Special Report of the Inclosure Commissioners of England and Wales.
| Contagious Diseases of Sheep Act 1858 (repealed) | 21 & 22 Vict. c. 62 | 2 August 1858 |
An Act to continue certain Acts to prevent the spreading of contagious or infectious Diseases among Sheep, Cattle, and other Animals. (Repealed by Statute Law Revision Act 1875 (38 & 39 Vict. c. 66))
| Annual Turnpike Acts Continuance Act 1858 or the Turnpike Acts Continuance Act 1858 (repealed) | 21 & 22 Vict. c. 63 | 2 August 1858 |
An Act to continue certain Turnpike Acts in Great Britain. (Repealed by Statute Law Revision Act 1875 (38 & 39 Vict. c. 66))
| Vaccination (Ireland) Act 1858 (repealed) | 21 & 22 Vict. c. 64 | 2 August 1858 |
An Act to make further Provision for the Practice of Vaccination in Ireland. (Repealed by Vaccination (Ireland) Act 1863 (26 & 27 Vict. c. 52), Statute Law Revision Act 1875 (38 & 39 Vict. c. 66), Statute Law Revision Act 1892 (55 & 56 Vict. c. 19), Health Services Act (Northern Ireland) 1948 (c. 3 (N.I.)) and Statute Law Revision Act (Northern Ireland) 1954 (c. 35 (N.I.)))
| Police (Scotland) Act 1858 (repealed) | 21 & 22 Vict. c. 65 | 2 August 1858 |
An Act to amend an Act of the last Session, (Note: Police (Scotland) Act 1857 (20 & 21 Vict. c. 72)) to render more effectual the Police in Counties and Burghs in Scotland. (Repealed by Police (Scotland) Act 1956 (4 & 5 Eliz. 2. c. 26))
| Chelsea Bridge Act 1858 (repealed) | 21 & 22 Vict. c. 66 | 2 August 1858 |
An Act to amend the Act of the Ninth and Tenth Years of Her present Majesty, Chapter Thirty-nine, (Note: Battersea Bridge and Embankment, etc. Act 1846 (9 & 10 Vict. c. 39)) and to abolish Foot Passenger Tolls on Chelsea Bridge after Payment of the Sum of Eighty thousand Pounds and Interest. (Repealed by Local Law (Greater London Council and Inner London Boroughs) Order 1965 (SI 1965/540))
| Returns to Secretary of State Act 1858 (repealed) | 21 & 22 Vict. c. 67 | 2 August 1858 |
An Act to repeal certain Enactments requiring Returns to be made to One of the Secretaries of State. (Repealed by Statute Law Revision Act 1875 (38 & 39 Vict. c. 66))
| Detached Parts of Counties (England) Act 1858 (repealed) | 21 & 22 Vict. c. 68 | 2 August 1858 |
An Act to amend the Law concerning detached Parts of Counties. (Repealed by Statute Law Revision Act 1892 (55 & 56 Vict. c. 19))
| Herring Fisheries (Scotland) Act 1858 (repealed) | 21 & 22 Vict. c. 69 | 2 August 1858 |
An Act to impose Fees on the branding of Barrels under the Acts concerning the Herring Fisheries in Scotland. (Repealed by Statute Law Revision Act 1963 (c. 30))
| Copyright of Designs Act 1858 (repealed) | 21 & 22 Vict. c. 70 | 2 August 1858 |
An Act to amend the Act of the Fifth and Sixth Years of Her present Majesty, (Note: Copyright of Designs Act 1842 (5 & 6 Vict. c. 100)) to consolidate and amend the Laws relating to the Copyright of Designs for ornamenting Articles of Manufacture. (Repealed by Patents, Designs, and Trade Marks Act 1883 (46 & 47 Vict. c. 57))
| Bishops Trusts Substitution Act 1858 | 21 & 22 Vict. c. 71 | 2 August 1858 |
An Act to substitute in certain Cases the Bishop of one Diocese for the Bishop of another as a Trustee of certain Trusts.
| Landed Estates Court (Ireland) Act 1858 | 21 & 22 Vict. c. 72 | 2 August 1858 |
An Act to facilitate the Sale and Transfer of Land in Ireland.
| Stipendiary Magistrates Act 1858 (repealed) | 21 & 22 Vict. c. 73 | 2 August 1858 |
An Act to amend the Law concerning the Powers of Stipendiary Magistrates and Justices of the Peace in certain Cases. (Repealed by Statute Law (Repeals) Act 1981 (c. 19))
| County Courts Act 1858 or the County Court Districts (England) Act 1858 (repealed) | 21 & 22 Vict. c. 74 | 2 August 1858 |
An Act for the Re-arrangement of the Districts of the County Courts among the Judges thereof. (Repealed by County Courts Act 1888 (51 & 52 Vict. c. 43))
| Cheap Trains and Canal Carriers Act 1858 (repealed) | 21 & 22 Vict. c. 75 | 2 August 1858 |
An Act to amend the Law relating to Cheap Trains, and to restrain the Exercise of certain Powers by Canal Companies being also Railway Companies. (Repealed by Statute Law Revision Act 1960 (8 & 9 Eliz. 2. c. 56))
| Titles to Land (Scotland) Act 1858 (repealed) | 21 & 22 Vict. c. 76 | 2 August 1858 |
An Act to simplify the Forms and diminish the Expense of completing Titles to Land in Scotland. (Repealed by Titles to Land Consolidation (Scotland) Act 1868 (31 & 32 Vict. c. 101))
| Settled Estates Act 1858 (repealed) | 21 & 22 Vict. c. 77 | 2 August 1858 |
An Act to amend and extend the Settled Estates Act of 1856. (Note: Settled Estates Act 1856 (19 & 20 Vict. c. 120)) (Repealed by Settled Estates Act 1877 (40 & 41 Vict. c. 18))
| Parliamentary Witnesses Act 1858 | 21 & 22 Vict. c. 78 | 2 August 1858 |
An Act to enable the Committees of both Houses of Parliament to administer Oaths to Witnesses in certain Cases.
| Drafts on Bankers Act 1858 (repealed) | 21 & 22 Vict. c. 79 | 2 August 1858 |
An Act to amend the Law relating to Cheques or Drafts on Bankers. (Repealed by Crossed Cheques Act 1876 (39 & 40 Vict. c. 81))
| Provisional Order Confirmation Turnpikes Act 1858 (repealed) | 21 & 22 Vict. c. 80 | 2 August 1858 |
An Act to confirm certain Provisional Orders made under an Act of the Fifteenth Year of Her present Majesty, (Note: Turnpike Trusts (Making of Provisional Orders) Act 1851 (14 & 15 Vict. c. 38)) to facilitate Arrangements for the Belief of Turnpike Trusts. (Repealed by Statute Law (Repeals) Act 1981 (c. 19))
| Cowley's Charity Act 1858 | 21 & 22 Vict. c. 81 | 2 August 1858 |
An Act for confirming a Scheme as amended of the Charity Commissioners for Cowley's Charity in the Parish of Swineshead in the County of Lincoln.
| | Scheme for the Application and Management of Thomas Cowley's Charity, in the Parish of Swineshead, in the County of Lincoln. | |
| Militia Pay Act 1858 (repealed) | 21 & 22 Vict. c. 82 | 2 August 1858 |
An Act to defray the Charge of the Pay, Clothing, and contingent and other Expenses of the Disembodied Militia in Great Britain and Ireland; to grant Allowances in certain Cases to Subaltern Officers, Adjutants, Paymasters, Quartermasters, Surgeons, Assistant Surgeons, and Surgeons Mates of the Militia; and to authorise the Employment of the Non-commissioned Officers. (Repealed by Statute Law Revision Act 1875 (38 & 39 Vict. c. 66))
| Universities (Scotland) Act 1858 | 21 & 22 Vict. c. 83 | 2 August 1858 |
An Act to make Provision for the better Government and Discipline of the Universities of Scotland, and improving and regulating the Course of Study therein; and for the Union of the Two Universities and Colleges of Aberdeen.
| Four Courts (Dublin) Extension Act 1858 or the Dublin, Four Courts Act 1858 or the Four Courts Extension Act 1858 (repealed) | 21 & 22 Vict. c. 84 | 2 August 1858 |
An Act for enabling the Commissioners of Public Works in Ireland to acquire certain Lands and Houses for the Site of a new Court or Courts, and other Offices and Buildings required for the Public Service, in Extension of the Four Courts in the City of Dublin; and for other Purposes. (Repealed by Statute Law (Repeals) Act 2013 (c. 2))
| Militia (No. 2) Act 1858 (repealed) | 21 & 22 Vict. c. 85 | 2 August 1858 |
An Act to continue an Act (Note: Militia (No. 1) Act 1855 (18 & 19 Vict. c. 1)) to enable Her Majesty to accept the Services of the Militia out of the United Kingdom. (Repealed by Statute Law Revision Act 1875 (38 & 39 Vict. c. 66))
| Militia Embodiment Act 1858 (repealed) | 21 & 22 Vict. c. 86 | 2 August 1858 |
An Act further to continue an Act (Note: Militia Embodiment Act 1857 (20 & 21 Vict. c. 82)) to authorize the embodying of the Militia. (Repealed by Statute Law Revision Act 1875 (38 & 39 Vict. c. 66))
| Corrupt Practices Act 1858 (repealed) | 21 & 22 Vict. c. 87 | 2 August 1858 |
An Act to continue and amend the Corrupt Practices Prevention Act, 1854. (Note: Corrupt Practices Prevention Act 1854 (17 & 18 Vict. c. 102)) (Repealed by Corrupt and Illegal Practices Prevention Act 1883 (46 & 47 Vict. c. 51))
| Chairman of Quarter Sessions (Ireland) Act 1858 (repealed) | 21 & 22 Vict. c. 88 | 2 August 1858 |
An Act to amend an Act of the Fourteenth and Fifteenth Years of Her present Majesty, (Note: Civil Bill Courts (Ireland) Act 1851 (14 & 15 Vict. c. 57)) to consolidate and amend the Laws relating to Civil Bills and the Courts of Quarter Sessions in Ireland, and to transfer to the Assistant Barristers certain Jurisdiction as to Insolvent Debtors. (Repealed by Statute Law Revision Act 1892 (55 & 56 Vict. c. 19), Statute Law Revision Act 1893 (56 & 57 Vict. c. 14) and County Courts Act (Northern Ireland) 1959 (c. 25 (N.I.)))
| Lunatics (Scotland) Act 1858 (repealed) | 21 & 22 Vict. c. 89 | 2 August 1858 |
An Act to amend an Act of the last Session, (Note: Lunacy (Scotland) Act 1857 (20 & 21 Vict. c. 71)) for the Regulation of the Care and Treatment of Lunatics, and for the Provision, Maintenance, and Regulation of Lunatic Asylums, in Scotland. (Repealed by Statute Law Revision Act 1875 (38 & 39 Vict. c. 66))
| Medical Act 1858 | 21 & 22 Vict. c. 90 | 2 August 1858 |
An Act to Regulate the Qualifications of Practitioners in Medicine and Surgery.
| Joint Stock Banks Act 1858 (repealed) | 21 & 22 Vict. c. 91 | 2 August 1858 |
An Act to enable Joint Stock Banking Companies to be formed on the Principle of Limited Liability. (Repealed by Companies Act 1862 (25 & 26 Vict. c. 89))
| County Property Act 1858 (repealed) | 21 & 22 Vict. c. 92 | 2 August 1858 |
An Act to provide for the Conveyance of County Property to the Clerk of the Peace of the County. (Repealed by Statute Law Revision Act 1892 (55 & 56 Vict. c. 19))
| Legitimacy Declaration Act 1858 | 21 & 22 Vict. c. 93 | 2 August 1858 |
An Act to enable Persons to establish Legitimacy and the Validity of Marriages, and the Right to be deemed natural-born Subjects.
| Copyhold Act 1858 or the Copyholds Act 1858 (repealed) | 21 & 22 Vict. c. 94 | 2 August 1858 |
An Act to amend the Copyhold Acts. (Repealed by Copyhold Act 1894 (57 & 58 Vict. c. 46))
| Court of Probate Act 1858 (repealed) | 21 & 22 Vict. c. 95 | 2 August 1858 |
An Act to amend the Act of the Twentieth and Twenty-first Victoria, Chapter Seventy-seven. (Note: Court of Probate Act 1857 (20 & 21 Vict. c. 77)) (Repealed by Senior Courts Act 1981 (c. 54))
| West Indian Incumbered Estates Act 1858 (repealed) | 21 & 22 Vict. c. 96 | 2 August 1858 |
An Act to amend "The West Indian Incumbered Estates Act, 1854." (Note: West Indian Incumbered Estates Act 1854 (17 & 18 Vict. c. 117)) (Repealed by West Indian Incumbered Estates Act 1886 (49 & 50 Vict. c. 36))
| Public Health Act 1858 (repealed) | 21 & 22 Vict. c. 97 | 2 August 1858 |
An Act for vesting in the Privy Council certain Powers for the Protection of the Public Health. (Repealed by Pharmacy Act 1954 (2 & 3 Eliz. 2. c. 61))
| Local Government Act 1858 (repealed) | 21 & 22 Vict. c. 98 | 2 August 1858 |
An Act to amend the Public Health Act, 1848, and to make further Provision for the Local Government of Towns and populous Districts. (Repealed by Public Health Act 1875 (38 & 39 Vict. c. 55) and Local Government Act 1972 (c. 70))
| British Columbia Government Act 1858 (repealed) | 21 & 22 Vict. c. 99 | 2 August 1858 |
An Act to provide for the Government of British Columbia. (Repealed by British Columbia Act 1866 (29 & 30 Vict. c. 67))
| Petty Sessions Clerk (Ireland) Act 1858 (repealed) | 21 & 22 Vict. c. 100 | 2 August 1858 |
An Act to regulate the Office of Clerk of Petty Sessions in Ireland. (Repealed by Magistrates' Courts Act (Northern Ireland) 1964 (c. 21 (N.I.)))
| Friendly Societies Act 1858 (repealed) | 21 & 22 Vict. c. 101 | 2 August 1858 |
An Act to amend the Act of the Eighteenth and Nineteenth Years of Her present Majesty, Chapter Sixty-three, (Note: Friendly Societies Act 1855 (18 & 19 Vict. c. 63)) relating to Friendly Societies. (Repealed by Friendly Societies Act 1875 (38 & 39 Vict. c. 60))
| Works of Utility, etc., Indemnity Act 1858 (repealed) | 21 & 22 Vict. c. 102 | 2 August 1858 |
An Act to indemnify certain Persons who have formed a voluntary Association for the Disposal of Works of Utility and Ornament by Chance or otherwise as Prizes. (Repealed by Statute Law Revision Act 1875 (38 & 39 Vict. c. 66))
| Reformatory Schools (Ireland) Act 1858 (repealed) | 21 & 22 Vict. c. 103 | 2 August 1858 |
An Act to promote and regulate Reformatory Schools for Juvenile Offenders in Ireland. (Repealed by Irish Reformatory Schools Act 1868 (31 & 32 Vict. c. 59))
| Metropolis Management Amendment Act 1858 (repealed) | 21 & 22 Vict. c. 104 | 2 August 1858 |
An Act to alter and amend the Metropolis Local Management Act (1855), (Note: Metropolis Management Act 1855 (18 & 19 Vict. c. 120)) and to extend the Powers of the Metropolitan Board of Works for the Purification Of the Thames and the Main Drainage of the Metropolis. (Repealed by Public Health (London) Act 1936 (26 Geo. 5 & 1 Edw. 8. c. 50))
| Judgment Mortgage (Ireland) Act 1858 (repealed) | 21 & 22 Vict. c. 105 | 2 August 1858 |
An Act to amend an Act of the Thirteenth and Fourteenth Years of Her present Majesty, (Note: Judgment Mortgage (Ireland) Act 1850 (13 & 14 Vict. c. 29)) to amend the Laws concerning Judgments in Ireland. (Repealed by Judgments (Enforcement) Act (Northern Ireland) 1969 (c. 30 (N.I.)))
| Government of India Act 1858 (repealed) | 21 & 22 Vict. c. 106 | 2 August 1858 |
An Act for the better Government of India. (Repealed by Government of India Act 1915 (5 & 6 Geo. 5. c. 61) and Ministers of the Crown Act 1937 (1 Edw. 8 & 1 Geo. 6. c. 38))
| Appropriation Act 1858 (repealed) | 21 & 22 Vict. c. 107 | 2 August 1858 |
An Act to Apply a Sum out of the Consolidated Fund and the Surplus of Ways and Means to the Service of the Year One thousand eight hundred and fifty-eight, and to appropriate the Supplies granted in this Session of Parliament. (Repealed by Statute Law Revision Act 1875 (38 & 39 Vict. c. 66))
| Matrimonial Causes Act 1858 (repealed) | 21 & 22 Vict. c. 108 | 2 August 1858 |
An Act to amend the Act of the Twentieth and Twenty-first Victoria, Chapter Eighty-five. (Note: Matrimonial Causes Act 1857 (20 & 21 Vict. c. 85)) (Repealed by Divorce Amendment Act 1868 (31 & 32 Vict. c. 77), Statute Law Revision Act 1875 (38 & 39 Vict. c. 66), Commissioners for Oaths Act 1889 (52 & 53 Vict. c. 10), Statute Law Revision Act 1892 (55 & 56 Vict. c. 19), Administration of Justice Act 1925 (15 & 16 Geo. 5. c. 28), Supreme Court of Judicature (Consolidation) Act 1925 (15 & 16 Geo. 5. c. 49) and Matrimonial Causes Rules 1937 (SR&O 1937/1113))
| Cornwall Submarine Mines Act 1858 | 21 & 22 Vict. c. 109 | 2 August 1858 |
An Act to declare and define the respective Rights of Her Majesty and of His Royal Highness the Prince of Wales and Duke of Cornwall to the Mines and Minerals in or under Land lying below High-water Mark, within and adjacent to the County of Cornwall, and for other Purposes.
| Election of Members during Recess Act 1858 (repealed) | 21 & 22 Vict. c. 110 | 2 August 1858 |
An Act to extend the Act of the Twenty-fourth Year of King George the Third, Chapter Twenty-six, (Note: Recess Elections Act 1784 (24 Geo. 3. Sess. 2. c. 26)) for issuing Writs during any Recess of the House of Commons, whether by Prorogation or Adjournment. (Repealed by Recess Elections Act 1975 (c. 66))

=== Local acts ===
| Short title | Citation | Royal assent |
Long title
| Birmingham and Staffordshire Gas (New Capital) Act 1858 (repealed) | 21 & 22 Vict. c. i | 11 May 1858 |
An Act to empower the Birmingham and Staffordshire Gaslight Company to raise a further Sum of Money. (Repealed by Birmingham Corporation (Consolidation) Act 1883 (46 & 47 Vict. c. lxx))
| Whitehaven Harbour Act 1858 | 21 & 22 Vict. c. ii | 11 May 1858 |
An Act to amend the Act, Fifty-sixth King George the Third, Chapter Forty-four, (Note: Whitehaven Improvement Act 1816 (56 Geo. 3. c. xliv)) for improving the Port, Harbour, and Town of Whitehaven in the County of Cumberland, in relation to the Securities to be granted for borrowed Money.
| Edinburgh Life Assurance Company's Amendment Act 1858 | 21 & 22 Vict. c. iii | 11 May 1858 |
An Act for conferring additional Powers and Privileges on the Edinburgh Life Assurance Company.
| Cheltenham Waterworks (Capital) Act 1858 | 21 & 22 Vict. c. iv | 11 May 1858 |
An Act to empower the Cheltenham Waterworks Company to raise a further Sum of Money.
| Gosport Waterworks Act 1858 | 21 & 22 Vict. c. v | 11 May 1858 |
An Act for supplying with Water the Inhabitants of Gosport, Forton, and Anglesey, and other Places in the Parish of Alverstoke in the County of Hants.
| Chester Gas Act 1858 (repealed) | 21 & 22 Vict. c. vi | 11 May 1858 |
An Act to incorporate the Chester United Gas Company, and to confer upon them further Powers for the Supply of Gas to the City and Borough of Chester and the Suburbs thereof. (Repealed by Cheshire County Council Act 1980 (c. xiii))
| Haslingden and Rawtenstall Waterworks Act 1858 (repealed) | 21 & 22 Vict. c. vii | 11 May 1858 |
An Act to extend the Time for the Construction of the Haslingden and Rawtenstall Waterworks. (Repealed by Bury and District Joint Water Board Act 1903 (3 Edw. 7. c. ccxxxiv))
| Madras Irrigation Channel Act 1858 | 21 & 22 Vict. c. viii | 11 May 1858 |
An Act for incorporating "The Madras Irrigation and Canal Company," and for other Purposes connected therewith.
| Nottingham Gas Amendment Act 1858 (repealed) | 21 & 22 Vict. c. ix | 11 May 1858 |
An Act to enable the Nottingham Gaslight and Coke Company to raise a further Sum of Money, and to afford a Supply of Gas to Places in the Neighbourhood of Nottingham; and for other Purposes. (Repealed by Statute Law (Repeals) Act 1995 (c. 44))
| Folkestone Waterworks Amendment Act 1858 | 21 & 22 Vict. c. x | 11 May 1858 |
An Act to enable the Folkestone Waterworks Company to raise further Moneys; and to confer upon them other Powers.
| Liskeard and Looe Railway Act 1858 | 21 & 22 Vict. c. xi | 11 May 1858 |
An Act to empower the Liskeard and Looe Union Canal Company to construct a Railway from Moors Water to Looe, all in the County of Cornwall; and for other Purposes.
| Merthyr Tydfil Water Act 1858 | 21 & 22 Vict. c. xii | 21 May 1858 |
An Act to confer upon the Local Board of Health for the District of Merthyr Tydfil further Powers with reference to the Supply of Water; and for other Purposes.
| Caledonian Railway (Dalmarnock Branch) Act 1858 | 21 & 22 Vict. c. xiii | 21 May 1858 |
An Act to enable the Caledonian Railway Company to make a Branch Railway to Dalmarnoch in the County oi Lanark; and for other Purposes.
| Eden Valley Railway Act 1858 | 21 & 22 Vict. c. xiv | 21 May 1858 |
An Act to authorize the making of a Railway from the Lancaster and Carlisle Railway at or near Clifton to the South Durham and Lancashire Union Railway at or near Kirkby Stephen, all in the County of Westmoreland; and for other Purposes.
| Symington, Biggar and Broughton Railway Act 1858 | 21 & 22 Vict. c. xv | 21 May 1858 |
An Act for making a Railway from the Caledonian Railway, near Symington Station, to Biggar and Broughton; and for other Purposes.
| Dundalk and Enniskillen Railway (Capital) Act 1858 | 21 & 22 Vict. c. xvi | 21 May 1858 |
An Act to enable the Dundalk and Enniskillen Railway Company to raise further Money; and for other Purposes.
| British Gaslight Company (Sculcoates and Kingston-upon-Hull) Act 1858 | 21 & 22 Vict. c. xvii | 21 May 1858 |
An Act for better enabling the British Gaslight Company, Limited, to light with Gas certain Parts of the Town or Borough of Kingston-upon-Hull; and for other Purposes
| Aberdare Water Act 1858 | 21 & 22 Vict. c. xviii | 21 May 1858 |
An Act for better supplying with Water the Town and Parish of Aberdare in the County of Glamorgan.
| Knighton Railway Act 1858 | 21 & 22 Vict. c. xix | 21 May 1858 |
An Act for making a Railway from the Craven Arms Station of the Shrewsbury and Hereford Railway in the County of Salop to the Borough of Knighton in the County of Radnor; and for other Purposes.
| Barnstaple Waterworks Act 1858 (repealed) | 21 & 22 Vict. c. xx | 21 May 1858 |
An Act for better supplying with Water the Borough of Barnstaple and Places adjacent thereto, in the County of Devon; and for other Purposes. (Repealed by North Devon Water Board Act 1945 (9 & 10 Geo. 6. c. vi))
| Newport (Salop) Markets Act 1858 | 21 & 22 Vict. c. xxi | 21 May 1858 |
An Act for providing a Market House and Market Place and other Buildings for Public Accommodation at the Town of Newport in the County of Salop, and for establishing and regulating Markets and Fairs there; and for opening a new Street and widening other Streets, and otherwise improving the Town; and for other Purposes.
| Peniston, Thurlstone and Oxspring Gas Act 1858 | 21 & 22 Vict. c. xxii | 21 May 1858 |
An Act for supplying and lighting with Gas the several Townships of Peniston, Thurlstone, and Oxspring, and Places adjacent, all in the Parish of Feniston in the West Riding of the County of York.
| Liverpool Exchange Act 1858 (repealed) | 21 & 22 Vict. c. xxiii | 14 June 1858 |
An Act to repeal the Act (Note: Liverpool Exchange Act 1802 (42 Geo. 3. c. lxxi)) relating to the Company of Proprietors of the Liverpool Exchange, and to substitute other Provisions in lieu thereof. (Repealed by Liverpool Exchange Act 1859 (22 & 23 Vict. c. xxviii))
| Manchester Assize Courts Act 1858 (repealed) | 21 & 22 Vict. c. xxiv | 14 June 1858 |
An Act for enabling the Justices of the County of Lancaster to erect or provide Assize Courts in or near Manchester in the Hundred of Salford; and for other Purposes. (Repealed by Criminal Justice Administration Act 1956 (4 & 5 Eliz. 2. c. 34))
| Manchester Improvement Act 1858 | 21 & 22 Vict. c. xxv | 14 June 1858 |
An Act for enabling the Corporation of the City of Manchester to raise further Sums of Money; and for other Purposes.
| Tay Fisheries Act 1858 | 21 & 22 Vict. c. xxvi | 14 June 1858 |
An Act to regulate the Annual Close Time for Salmon Fisheries in the River Tay and its Tributaries and on the Sea Coasts adjoining.
| Birmingham Canal Navigations Act 1858 | 21 & 22 Vict. c. xxvii | 14 June 1858 |
An Act for enabling the Company of Proprietors of the Birmingham Canal Navigations to raise further Money; and for other Purposes.
| Garngad Road Act 1858 | 21 & 22 Vict. c. xxviii | 14 June 1858 |
An Act to provide for the better Maintenance of the Garngad Road in the County of Lanark.
| Selkirk and Galashiels Railway Amendment Act 1858 (repealed) | 21 & 22 Vict. c. xxix | 14 June 1858 |
An Act to enable the Selkirk and Galashiels Railway Company to raise additional Capital. (Repealed by North British and Selkirk Railways Amalgamation Act 1859 (22 & 23 Vict. c. xiv))
| Ely Valley (Mwyndy Branch) Act 1858 or the Ely Valley Railway (Mwyndy Branch) Act 1858 | 21 & 22 Vict. c. xxx | 14 June 1858 |
An Act to authorize the Ely Valley Railway Company to make a Branch Railway, to be called "The Mwyndy Branch;" and for other Purposes.
| Malvern Improvement Amendment Act 1858 | 21 & 22 Vict. c. xxxi | 14 June 1858 |
An Act for granting further Powers to the Malvern Improvement Commissioners.
| Vauxhall Bridge Road Act 1858 | 21 & 22 Vict. c. xxxii | 14 June 1858 |
An Act for repealing so much of several Acts for building Vauxhall Bridge, and for making convenient Roads thereto, as relate to certain of such Roads; providing for the future Maintenance and Repair of such Roads; and for other Purposes.
| Staffordshire Potteries Gas Act 1858 or the British Gaslight Company Limited (Staffordshire Potteries) Act 1858 | 21 & 22 Vict. c. xxxiii | 14 June 1858 |
An Act for better enabling the British Gaslight Company, Limited, to light with Gas certain Parts of the District called the Staffordshire Potteries; and for other Purposes.
| Trent Navigation Act 1858 | 21 & 22 Vict. c. xxxiv | 14 June 1858 |
An Act for more effectually maintaining the Navigation of the River Trent from Wilden Ferry in the Counties of Derby and Leicester, or One of them, to Gainsborough in the County of Lincoln, and other Works connected therewith.
| London Docks Act 1858 (repealed) | 21 & 22 Vict. c. xxxv | 14 June 1858 |
An Act to enable the London Dock Company to raise a further Sum of Money, and to augment their Capital Stock; and for other Purposes connected with their Docks. (Repealed by London and Saint Katharine Docks Act 1864 (27 & 28 Vict. c. clxxviii))
| Maidstone Gasworks Act 1858 | 21 & 22 Vict. c. xxxvi | 14 June 1858 |
An Act for lighting with Gas the Parish of Maidstone and the Neighbourhood thereof in the County of Kent.
| Manchester, Hyde and Mottram Road Act 1858 | 21 & 22 Vict. c. xxxvii | 14 June 1858 |
An Act for the more effectual Management and Repair of the Road from Manchester in the County Palatine of Lancaster, through Hyde, to Mottram-in-Longdendale in the County Palatine of Chester.
| Victoria Park Approach Act 1858 | 21 & 22 Vict. c. xxxviii | 14 June 1858 |
An Act to authorize the Metropolitan Board of Works to form an improved Communication between Limehouse and the Victoria Park in the County of Middlesex; and for other Purposes.
| Burghead Harbour Act 1858 (repealed) | 21 & 22 Vict. c. xxxix | 14 June 1858 |
An Act for extending, improving^ and maintaining the Port and Harbour of Burghead in the County of Elgin. (Repealed by Grampian Regional Council (Harbours) Order Confirmation Act 1987 (c. x))
| Stoke, Fenton and Longton Gas Act 1858 (repealed) | 21 & 22 Vict. c. xl | 14 June 1858 |
An Act for incorporating the Stoke, Fenton, and Longton Gaslight Company, and extending their Powers; and for other Purposes. (Repealed by Stoke-on-Trent (Gas Consolidation) Act 1922 (12 & 13 Geo. 5. c. xxii))
| Sufferance Wharves (Port of London) Act 1858 (repealed) | 21 & 22 Vict. c. xli | 14 June 1858 |
An Act for the Regulation of certain Public Sufferance Wharves in the Port of London. (Repealed by Statute Law (Repeals) Act 1993 (c. 50))
| Besselsleigh Road Act 1858 (repealed) | 21 & 22 Vict. c. xlii | 14 June 1858 |
An Act to repeal the Acts relating to the Besselsleigh Turnpike Road in the County of Berks, and to make other Provisions in lieu thereof. (Repealed by Annual Turnpike Acts Continuance Act 1878 (41 & 42 Vict. c. 62))
| Alyth Railway Act 1858 | 21 & 22 Vict. c. xliii | 14 June 1858 |
An Act for making a Railway from the Meigle Station of the Scottish North-eastern Railway to the Town of Alyth, to be called "The Alyth Railway;" and for other Purposes in relation thereto.
| Brentford Gas Act 1858 | 21 & 22 Vict. c. xliv | 14 June 1858 |
An Act for increasing and regulating the Capital and Borrowing Powers of the Brentford Gaslight Company; for consolidating into One Act the Provisions of the several Acts relating to the Company; and for other Purposes.
| Inverury and Old Meldrum Junction Railway Lease Act 1858 | 21 & 22 Vict. c. xlv | 14 June 1858 |
An Act for vesting the Inverury and Old Meldrum Junction Railway by way of Lease in the Great North of Scotland Railway Company; and for other Purposes.
| Banbridge, Lisburn and Belfast Railway Act 1858 | 21 & 22 Vict. c. xlvi | 14 June 1858 |
An Act for making a Railway from Banbridge to Lisburn, to be called "The Banbridge, Lisburn, and Belfast Railway;" and for other Purposes.
| East Suffolk Railway (Branch and Capital) Act 1858 | 21 & 22 Vict. c. xlvii | 28 June 1858 |
An Act to enable the East Suffolk Railway Company to construct a Branch Railway near Lowestoft; to raise further Sums of Money; and for other Purposes.
| Waterford and Kilkenny Railway Company's Act 1858 | 21 & 22 Vict. c. xlviii | 28 June 1858 |
An Act to confer upon the Waterford and Kilkenny Railway Company Facilities for raising Money.
| Horsham and Dorking Turnpike Road Act 1858 (repealed) | 21 & 22 Vict. c. xlix | 28 June 1858 |
An Act for repairing and maintaining the Road from Horsham in the County of Sussex, through Dorking and Leatherhead, to Epsom in the County of Surrey, and from Capel to Stone Street at Ockley in the said County of Surrey. (Repealed by Statute Law (Repeals) Act 2013 (c. 2))
| Stokes Bay Railway and Pier Act 1858 | 21 & 22 Vict. c. l | 28 June 1858 |
An Act for extending the Time for the Completion of the Works authorized by "The Stokes Bay Railway and Pier Act, 1855;" (Note: Stokes Bay Railway and Pier Act 1855 (18 & 19 Vict. c. cxcii)) and for other Purposes.
| East Kent Railway (Extension to Dover) Amendment Act 1858 | 21 & 22 Vict. c. li | 28 June 1858 |
An Act to amend the Acts relating to "The East Kent Railway (Extension to Dover)."
| Taunton Waterworks Act 1858 (repealed) | 21 & 22 Vict. c. lii | 28 June 1858 |
An Act for better supplying with Water the Inhabitants of the Town of Taunton in the County of Somerset. (Repealed by Taunton Corporation Act 1900 (63 & 64 Vict. c. cclxxxiii))
| Ballymena and Portrush Railway Act 1858 | 21 & 22 Vict. c. liii | 28 June 1858 |
An Act to enable the Ballymena, Ballymoney, Coleraine, and Portrush Junction Railway Company to sell their Undertaking to the Belfast and Ballymena Railway Company.
| Tramore Embankment Amendment Act 1858 | 21 & 22 Vict. c. liv | 28 June 1858 |
An Act to amend "The Tramore Embankment Act, 1852." (Note: Tramore Embankment Act 1852 (15 & 16 Vict. c. cxi))
| City of Waterford Gas Act 1858 | 21 & 22 Vict. c. lv | 28 June 1858 |
An Act for incorporating the City of Waterford Gas Company, and for authorizing them to acquire the existing Gasworks at Waterford, and to supply Gas; and for other Purposes.
| Exeter and Exmouth Railway Act 1858 | 21 & 22 Vict. c. lvi | 28 June 1858 |
An Act for authorizing the Abandonment of Part of the authorized Line of the Exeter and Exmouth Railway, and the making, instead of the Part so abandoned, of an Extension of the Main Line of the Railway; and for reducing and regulating the Capital and Borrowing Powers of the Exeter and Exmouth Railway Company; and for other Purposes.
| London, Brighton and South Coast Railway (Capital) Act 1858 | 21 & 22 Vict. c. lvii | 28 June 1858 |
An Act to confer upon the London, Brighton, and South Coast Railway Company further Powers for raising Money, and to authorize the Purchase and Lease by them of the Undertakings of certain other Railway Companies.
| Staines, Wokingham and Woking Railway Act 1858 | 21 & 22 Vict. c. lviii | 28 June 1858 |
An Act to authorize a Lease of the Staines, Wokingham, and Woking Railway to the London and South-western Railway Company, and for other Purposes connected with the Staines, Wokingham, and Woking Railway Company.
| Eastern Steam Navigation Company's Act 1858 | 21 & 22 Vict. c. lix | 28 June 1858 |
An Act for enabling the Eastern Steam Navigation Company to extend their Powers of trading, to increase their Capital, and to alter and amend their Charter and Deed of Settlement.
| Globe Insurance Act 1858 | 21 & 22 Vict. c. lx | 28 June 1858 |
An Act to enable the Globe Insurance Company to alter and amend some of the Provisions of their Deed of Settlement; and to confer further Powers on the Company.
| Cromford and High Peak Railway Act 1858 | 21 & 22 Vict. c. lxi | 28 June 1858 |
An Act to authorize the Cromford and High Peak Railway Company to raise further Sums of Money; and for other Purposes.
| Manchester Overseers Act 1858 (repealed) | 21 & 22 Vict. c. lxii | 28 June 1858 |
An Act providing for the separate Incorporation of the Overseers of the several Townships of Manchester, Ardwick, Chorlton-upon-Medloch, and Hulme for specific Purposes; for the levying and Collection of Rates; for the extinguishing the Exemption of Gasworks from Rates. (Repealed by Statute Law (Repeals) Act 2013 (c. 2))
| Wallasey Improvement Act 1858 | 21 & 22 Vict. c. lxiii | 28 June 1858 |
An Act for enabling the Local Board of Health for the District of Wallasey to construct Works and supply their District with Water and Gas; for enlarging their Powers with respect to the Acquisition and Maintenance of Ferries; and for other Purposes.
| Edinburgh and Glasgow and Stirling and Dunfermline Railways Act 1858 | 21 & 22 Vict. c. lxiv | 28 June 1858 |
An Act to vest the Stirling and Dunfermline Railway in the Edinburgh and Glasgow Railway Company, and for other Purposes.
| Fife and Kinross and Kinross-shire Railways Junction and Joint Station Act 1858 | 21 & 22 Vict. c. lxv | 28 June 1858 |
An Act for the Formation of a Junction between the Fife and Kinross and Kinross-shire Railways, and the Construction of a joint Station at Kinross.
| Caledonian Railway (Branch to Port Carlisle Railway) Act 1858 | 21 & 22 Vict. c. lxvi | 28 June 1858 |
An Act to enable the Caledonian Railway Company to make a Branch Railway to the Port Carlisle Railway; and for other Purposes.
| Salisbury and Yeovil Railway Act 1858 | 21 & 22 Vict. c. lxvii | 28 June 1858 |
An Act to extend the Time for the Completion of the Salisbury and Yeovil Railway, and to authorize the Sale thereof to the London and South-Western Railway Company.
| Blyth Harbour and Dock Act 1858 | 21 & 22 Vict. c. lxviii | 28 June 1858 |
An Act to repeal "The Blyth Harbour and Dock Act, 1854," (Note: Blyth Harbour and Dock Act 1854 (17 & 18 Vict. c. xcii)) and to regulate the Company constituted thereby; and for other Purposes.
| Chiswick Improvement Act 1858 | 21 & 22 Vict. c. lxix | 28 June 1858 |
An Act for the Improvement of the Parish of Chiswick in the County of Middlesex; and for other Purposes.
| Luton Gas Act 1858 | 21 & 22 Vict. c. lxx | 28 June 1858 |
An Act to incorporate the Luton Gas and Coke Company, to authorize the Adjustment and Increase of the present Capital, and for other Purposes.
| Balby and Worksop Road Act 1858 (repealed) | 21 & 22 Vict. c. lxxi | 28 June 1858 |
An Act to repeal "An Act for amending and maintaining the Turnpike Road from the Northern End of the Village of Balby in the County of York to Worksop in the County of Nottingham," (Note: Balby and Worksop Turnpike Road Act 1828 (9 Geo. 4. c. xlvi)) and to make other Provisions in lieu thereof so far as regards a Portion of the said Turnpike Rood. (Repealed by Annual Turnpike Acts Continuance Act 1877 (40 & 41 Vict. c. 64))
| Burry Navigation and Llanelly Harbour Act 1858 | 21 & 22 Vict. c. lxxii | 28 June 1858 |
An Act to alter and amend the Acts for the Improvement of the Navigation of the Rivers Burry, Loughor, and Lliedi, in the Counties of Carmarthen and Glamorgan, and to improve the Harbour of Llanelly in the said County of Carmarthen.
| Ayr and Dalmellington Railway Transfer Act 1858 | 21 & 22 Vict. c. lxxiii | 28 June 1858 |
An Act for enabling the Ayr and Dalmellington Railway Company to raise additional Capital; for vesting their Undertaking in the Glasgow and South-western Railway Company; and for other Purposes.
| Hertford, Luton and Dunstable Railway Act 1858 | 21 & 22 Vict. c. lxxiv | 28 June 1858 |
An Act for the Amalgamation of the Hertford and Welwyn Junction Railway Company and the Luton, Dunstable, and Welwyn Junction Railway Company into One Company to be called "The Hertford, Luton, and Dunstable Railway Company," and for regulating the Capital of the Company formed by the Amalgamation; and for other Purposes.
| Manchester, Sheffield and Lincolnshire Railway (Newton and Compstall Line) Act 1858 | 21 & 22 Vict. c. lxxv | 28 June 1858 |
An Act for enabling the Manchester, Sheffield, and Lincolnshire Railway Company to make a Railway from near their Newton and Hyde Station to the Township of Marple in the Parish of Stockport in the County of Chester, to be called the Newton and Compstall Branch; and for other Purposes.
| Bradford Corporation Waterworks Act 1858 | 21 & 22 Vict. c. lxxvi | 28 June 1858 |
An Act for extending the Limits of the Bradford Waterworks, and for authorizing the Construction of new and altered Works; and for empowering the Corporation of Bradford to borrow a further Sum of Money; and for other Purposes.
| Wexford Harbour Embankment Act 1858 | 21 & 22 Vict. c. lxxvii | 12 July 1858 |
An Act for enabling the Wexford Harbour Embankment Company to alter the Number of their Shares, and to issue Preference Shares in lieu of unissued Shares; and for other Purposes.
| Belfast and County Down Railway Act 1858 | 21 & 22 Vict. c. lxxviii | 12 July 1858 |
An Act to extend the Time for purchasing certain Lands required by the Belfast and County Down Railway Company, and for other Purposes connected with the same Company.
| British Gaslight Company (Norwich) Act 1858 | 21 & 22 Vict. c. lxxix | 12 July 1858 |
An Act for better enabling the British Gaslight Company, Limited, to light with Gas the City of Norwich and Suburbs thereof; to dissolve the Norwich Gaslight Company, and to repeal the Acts relating thereto.
| Liverpool Improvement Act 1858 (repealed) | 21 & 22 Vict. c. lxxx | 12 July 1858 |
An Act for enabling the Mayor, Aldermen, and Burgesses of the Borough of Liverpool to acquire Lands for a Post Office and Public Offices, and to make a new and widen existing Streets within the Borough; and for other Purposes. (Repealed by Liverpool Corporation Act 1921 (11 & 12 Geo. 5. c. lxxiv))
| Yar Bridge Act 1858 | 21 & 22 Vict. c. lxxxi | 12 July 1858 |
An Act for making and maintaining a Bridge over the River Yar in the Isle of Wight; with Approaches and Roads thereto; and for other Purposes.
| Andover and Redbridge Railway Act 1858 | 21 & 22 Vict. c. lxxxii | 12 July 1858 |
An Act to authorize the Construction of a Railway from Andover to Redbridge in the County of Southampton, and for that Purpose to convert the Andover Canal into a Railway.
| Oude Railway Act 1858 (repealed) | 21 & 22 Vict. c. lxxxiii | 12 July 1858 |
An Act to incorporate and regulate "The Oude Railway Company," to enable the Company to construct and maintain Railways in the East Indies, and to enter into Contracts with the East India Company; and for other Purposes. (Repealed by Statute Law (Repeals) Act 2013 (c. 2))
| London, Brighton and South Coast Railway (New Lines) Act 1858 | 21 & 22 Vict. c. lxxxiv | 12 July 1858 |
An Act to enable the London, Brighton, and South Coast Railway Company to complete the Communication by Railway between Shoreham, Henfield, and the Mid-Sussex Railway; and for other Purposes connected with their Undertaking.
| Birkenhead Improvement (General Mortgages) Act 1858 (repealed) | 21 & 22 Vict. c. lxxxv | 12 July 1858 |
An Act to amend the Birkenhead Improvement Amendment Act, 1850, (Note: Birkenhead Improvement Amendment Act 1850 (13 & 14 Vict. c. iii)) especially with respect to the General Mortgage Debt of the Commissioners and their Powers to sell certain Lands; and for other Purposes. (Repealed by Birkenhead Corporation Act 1881 (44 & 45 Vict. c. cliii))
| Dean Forest Turnpike Roads Act 1858 (repealed) | 21 & 22 Vict. c. lxxxvi | 12 July 1858 |
An Act to repeal the Act relating to the Dean Forest Turnpike Roads, and to make other Provisions in lieu thereof, and to authorize the Construction of a new Road; and for other Purposes. (Repealed by Statute Law (Repeals) Act 2013 (c. 2))
| Manchester Corporation Waterworks Act 1858 | 21 & 22 Vict. c. lxxxvii | 12 July 1858 |
An Act for amending the Acts relating to the Manchester Corporation Waterworks.
| Cornwall Railway Act 1858 (repealed) | 21 & 22 Vict. c. lxxxviii | 12 July 1858 |
An Act to extend the Time for the Completion of so much of the Cornwall Railway as lies between Truro and Falmouth; and for other Purposes. (Repealed by Cornwall Railway Act 1861 (24 & 25 Vict. c. ccxv))
| South Western Railway (Works and Capital) Act 1858 | 21 & 22 Vict. c. lxxxix | 12 July 1858 |
An Act for authorizing the London and South-western Railway Company to make new Works, and to make Arrangements with other Companies, and for authorizing a Lease to them of the Salisbury and Yeovil Railway, and for regulating their Capital and borrowing Powers; and for other Purposes.
| Mersey Docks and Harbour (Works) Act 1858 | 21 & 22 Vict. c. xc | 12 July 1858 |
An Act to enable the Mersey Docks and Harbour Board to construct certain Works at Birkenhead in substitution for and in addition to those already authorized, and for other Purposes.
| Halifax Park and Improvement Act 1858 | 21 & 22 Vict. c. xci | 12 July 1858 |
An Act for confirming the Gift by Francis Crossley Esquire to the Borough of Halifax of a Park for the Benefit of the Inhabitants of the Borough, and for authorizing the Mayor, Aldermen, and Burgesses of the Borough to maintain and regulate the Park, and to provide, maintain, and regulate Public Baths in the Park, and for making a Cemetery, and for making further Provision with respect to the Waterworks and the Gasworks, and the Improvement of the Borough; and for other Purposes.
| Mersey Dock Acts Consolidation Act 1858 | 21 & 22 Vict. c. xcii | 12 July 1858 |
An Act to consolidate and amend the Provisions of the several Acts relating to the Liverpool and Birkenhead Docks and the Port and Harbour of Liverpool, and for other Purposes connected therewith.
| Limerick and Foynes Railway Act 1858 | 21 & 22 Vict. c. xciii | 12 July 1858 |
An Act to afford Facilities to the Limerick and Foynes Railway Company for raising the Funds necessary to enable them to execute their Undertaking.
| Midland Great Western Railway of Ireland (Clara Deviation) Act 1858 (repealed) | 21 & 22 Vict. c. xciv | 12 July 1858 |
An Act to enable the Midland Great Western Railway of Ireland Company to make an Alteration in the Line of their Streamstown and Clara Junction Railway; and for other Purposes. (Repealed by Statute Law (Repeals) Act 2013 (c. 2))
| Corris, Machynlleth, and River Dovey Tramroad Act 1858 | 21 & 22 Vict. c. xcv | 12 July 1858 |
An Act for making a Tramroad from the Aberllefenny Slate Quarries in the Parish of Talyllun in the County of Merioneth to the River Dovey in the Parish of Llanfihangel-Geneu'r-Glyn in the County of Cardigan, with Brandies therefrom; and for other Purposes.
| Great Northern and Western (of Ireland) Railway Act 1858 | 21 & 22 Vict. c. xcvi | 12 July 1858 |
An Act to enable the Great Northern and Western (of Ireland) Railway Company to make Deviations in their authorized Railways, and to empower the Midland Great Western Railway of Ireland Company to acquire Shares in the Undertaking of the Great Northern and Western (of Ireland) Railway Company; and for other Purposes.
| Ware, Hadham and Buntingford Railway Act 1858 | 21 & 22 Vict. c. xcvii | 12 July 1858 |
An Act for making a Railway from the Hertford and Ware Branch of the Eastern Counties Railway to Buntingford.
| Ulverstone and Lancaster Railway Act 1858 | 21 & 22 Vict. c. xcviii | 12 July 1858 |
An Act for authorizing the raising by the Ulverstone and Lancaster Railway Company of further Money, and the selling or leasing of their Railway to the Furness Railway Company; or the making by the Two Companies of Working Arrangements; and for giving further Powers to the Two Companies respectively; and for other Purposes.
| Eastern Counties Railway Act 1858 | 21 & 22 Vict. c. xcix | 12 July 1858 |
An Act for enabling the Eastern Counties Railway Company to abandon a Portion of the Newmarket and Chesterford Railway, and also a Railway to the River Thames at Galleon's Reach.
| Bury and Radcliffe Waterworks Amendment Act 1858 | 21 & 22 Vict. c. c | 12 July 1858 |
An Act to enable the Bury and Radcliffe Waterworks Company to raise further Sums of Money; and to amend the Act (Note: Bury and Radcliffe Waterworks Act 1853 (16 & 17 Vict. c. xxxi)) relating to the Company.
| Portsmouth Railway Amendment Act 1858 | 21 & 22 Vict. c. ci | 12 July 1858 |
An Act for enabling the Portsmouth Railway Company to extend their Railway from Savant to Hilsea; to acquire additional Lands; to use a Portion of the London and South-western and London, Brighton, and South Coast Railways; and for other Purposes.
| South Devon and Tavistock Railway Act 1858 | 21 & 22 Vict. c. cii | 12 July 1858 |
An Act to authorize the South Devon and Tavistock Railway Company to lease their Railway, to enable them to raise further Capital for the Completion of their Undertaking, and to make Arrangements as to their Share and borrowed Capital; and for other Purposes.
| Northampton Gasworks Act 1858 | 21 & 22 Vict. c. ciii | 12 July 1858 |
An Act for lighting with Gas the Town of Northampton and the Neighbourhood thereof in the County of Northampton.
| West London and Crystal Palace Railway Act 1858 | 21 & 22 Vict. c. civ | 12 July 1858 |
An Act for enabling the Battersea Park Commissioners to sell and the West End of London and Crystal Palace Railway Company to purchase Pieces of Land situate near the South End of the new Bridge leading from Chelsea to Battersea Park, for Lease of Undertaking to the London, Brighton, and South Coast Railway Company, for extending the Time for completing Extension to Farnborough; and for other Purposes.
| Llandaff and Canton District Markets Act 1858 (repealed) | 21 & 22 Vict. c. cv | 12 July 1858 |
An Act for constructing a Market, Market Places, and Slaughter-houses, with all necessary Conveniences, within the Hamlet of Canton in the County of Glamorgan, to be called "The Llandaff and Canton District Markets." (Repealed by County of South Glamorgan Act 1976 (c. xxxv))
| Blackburn Railway Amalgamation Act 1858 | 21 & 22 Vict. c. cvi | 12 July 1858 |
An Act for vesting the Undertaking of the Blackburn Railway Company in the Lancashire and Yorkshire and East Lancashire Railway Companies; and for other Purposes.
| East Kent Railway (Western Extension) Act 1858 | 21 & 22 Vict. c. cvii | 23 July 1858 |
An Act for enabling the East Kent Railway Company to extend their Railway from Strood to join the Mid Kent Railway (Bromley to Saint Mary's Cray); and for other Purposes connected with their Undertaking.
| Formartine and Buchan Railway Act 1858 | 21 & 22 Vict. c. cviii | 23 July 1858 |
An Act for making a Railway from the Great North of Scotland Railway to Old Deer, and thence to Peterhead and Fraserburgh, with a Branch to Ellon, all in the County of Aberdeen, to be called "The Formartine and Buchan Railway."
| North British Railway Consolidation Act 1858 | 21 & 22 Vict. c. cix | 23 July 1858 |
An Act for consolidating and amending the Acts of the North British Railway Company, and for authorizing alterations in the Leith and Fisherrow or Musselburgh Branches thereof, and for other Purposes.
| Shrewsbury and Welchpool Railway Act 1858 or the Shrewsbury and Welshpool Railway Act 1858 | 21 & 22 Vict. c. cx | 23 July 1858 |
An Act for extending the Powers of the Shrewsbury and Welchpool Railway Company for purchasing Lands and completing their Railway; and for other Purposes.
| East Suffolk Railway Companies Amalgamation Act 1858 | 21 & 22 Vict. c. cxi | 23 July 1858 |
An Act for the Amalgamation of the Undertakings of the East Suffolk Railway Company, the Yarmouth and Haddiscoe Railway Company, and the Lowestoft and Beccles Railway Company; for leasing the same; and for other Purposes.
| Athenry and Tuam Railway Act 1858 (repealed) | 21 & 22 Vict. c. cxii | 23 July 1858 |
An Act for making a Railway from Athenry to Tuam in the County of Galway, and for other Purposes. (Repealed by Statute Law (Repeals) Act 2013 (c. 2))
| Great Northern and Manchester, Sheffield and Lincolnshire Railway Companies Act 1858 or the Great Northern and Manchester, Sheffield and Lincolnshire Traffic Arrangements Act 1858 | 21 & 22 Vict. c. cxiii | 23 July 1858 |
An Act to authorize the Great Northern and the Manchester, Sheffield, and Lincolnshire Railway Companies to work in common, and for certain other Purposes relating to the Great Northern Railway.
| Cleveland Railway Act 1858 | 21 & 22 Vict. c. cxiv | 23 July 1858 |
An Act for making a Railway from or near Guisbrough to or near to Skinningrove, all in Cleveland in the North Riding of the County of York; and for other Purposes.
| Stockton and Darlington Railway (Durham Line, &c.) Act 1858 | 21 & 22 Vict. c. cxv | 23 July 1858 |
An Act for enabling the Stockton and Darlington Railway Company to make a new Railway in the County of Durham in connexion with the Wear Valley and Stockton and Darlington Railways; to acquire additional Lands; and for other Purposes.
| Stockton and Darlington Railway Amalgamation Act 1858 | 21 & 22 Vict. c. cxvi | 23 July 1858 |
An Act for the Amalgamation of the Stockton and Darlington, the Wear Valley, the Middlesbrough and Redcar, the Middlesbrough and Guisbrough, and the Darlington and Barnard Castle Railway Companies; and for regulating the Capital and Borrowing Powers of the Stockton and Darlington Railway Company formed by the Amalgamation; and for other Purposes.
| Stockton and Darlington Railway (North Riding Lines) Act 1858 | 21 & 22 Vict. c. cxvii | 23 July 1858 |
An Act for enabling the Stockton and Darlington Railway Company to make a new Railway in the County of Durham in connexion with the Wear Valley and Stockton and Darlington Railways; to acquire additional Lands; and for other Purposes.
| Victoria Station and Pimlico Railway Act 1858 | 21 & 22 Vict. c. cxviii | 23 July 1858 |
An Act to authorize the Construction of a Station near Victoria Street, Pimlico, in the County of Middlesex, and of a Railway to connect the same with the West London and Crystal Palace Railway at Battersea in the County of Surrey, in order to afford improved Communication between certain of the Railways South of the Thames and the Western Districts of the Metropolis; and for other Purposes.
| Dublin and Meath Railway Act 1858 | 21 & 22 Vict. c. cxix | 23 July 1858 |
An Act for making a Railway Communication between Dublin and Meath.
| Hove Improvement Act 1858 | 21 & 22 Vict. c. cxx | 23 July 1858 |
An Act for the Improvement of the Western Parts of the Parish of Hove in the County of Sussex, and for establishing more efficient Police Regulations within the whole of the said Parish.
| Birkenhead Commissioners Act 1858 (repealed) | 21 & 22 Vict. c. cxxi | 23 July 1858 |
An Act to make Provision for better supplying Birkenhead and Claughton with Gas and Water, and for transferring the Undertaking of the Birkenhead and Claughton Gas and Water Company to the Birkenhead Improvement Commissioners; and for other Purposes. (Repealed by Birkenhead Corporation Act 1881 (44 & 45 Vict. c. cliii))
| Devon Valley Railway Act 1858 | 21 & 22 Vict. c. cxxii | 23 July 1858 |
An Act for making a Railway from the Tillicoultry Station of the Stirling and Dunfermline Railway to the Fife and Kinross Railway at Hopefield, to be called "The Devon Valley Railway," and for other Purposes in relation thereto.
| Oxford, Worcester and Wolverhampton Railway Act 1858 | 21 & 22 Vict. c. cxxiii | 23 July 1858 |
An Act to confer further Powers upon the Oxford, Worcester, and Wolverhampton Railway Company with respect to the Completion, Alteration, or Abandonment of certain of their Branch Railways, and to authorise certain Arrangements with respect to their Share Capital and the Purchase of the Stratford-upon-Avon Canal; and to amend the Acts relating to the Company; and for other Purposes.
| Windsor New Road Act 1858 | 21 & 22 Vict. c. cxxiv | 23 July 1858 |
An Act to authorize the making of a Turnpike Road from Thames Street in the Parish of Clewer in the Borough of New Windsor in the County of Berks to Oxford Road in the said Parish; and for other Purposes.
| Hesketh Marsh Act 1858 | 21 & 22 Vict. c. cxxv | 23 July 1858 |
An Act for carrying into effect an Agreement between the Ribble Navigation Company and Sir Thomas George Hesketh Baronet.
| Newport, Abergavenny and Hereford Railway Act 1858 | 21 & 22 Vict. c. cxxvi | 23 July 1858 |
An Act to enable the Newport, Abergavenny, and Hereford Railway Company to divert their Railway in the Parish of Aberdare in Glamorganshire; and to confer upon them other Powers.
| Whitehaven Junction Railway (New Branches) Act 1858 | 21 & 22 Vict. c. cxxvii | 23 July 1858 |
An Act to enable the Whitehaven Junction Railway Company to construct new Branches, to widen their Line, to erect Shipping Places and other Works, to raise a further Sum of Money; and for other Purposes.
| Lancaster and Carlisle Railway Act 1858 | 21 & 22 Vict. c. cxxviii | 23 July 1858 |
An Act to empower the Lancaster and Carlisle Railway Company to abandon a Part of the Lancaster and Carlisle and Ingleton Railway, and to alter and divert certain Roads in connexion with their Railway; to acquire additional Lands; and for other Purposes.
| Crystal Palace District Gas Company's Act 1858 (repealed) | 21 & 22 Vict. c. cxxix | 23 July 1858 |
An Act to incorporate the Crystal Palace District Gas Company; to enable the said Company to raise further Money; to authorize the Company to contract for and purchase the Undertaking, Land, and Premises of the Sydenham Gas and Coke Company; and for other Purposes connected therewith. (Repealed by South Suburban Gas Act 1928 (18 & 19 Geo. 5. c. lxxx))
| Chester and Holyhead Railway Act 1858 | 21 & 22 Vict. c. cxxx | 23 July 1858 |
An Act to authorize Arrangements between the Chester and Holyhead Railway Company and London and North-western Railway Company, and to authorize the Chester and Holyhead Railway Company to raise a further Sum of Money; and for other Purposes.
| London and North-western Railway (Additional Works) Act 1858 | 21 & 22 Vict. c. cxxxi | 23 July 1858 |
An Act for enabling the London and North-western Railway Company to construct Works and to acquire additional Lands in the Counties of Salop, Middlesex, Hertford, Buckingham, Warwick, Chester, Stafford, Northampton, Leicester, and Lancaster; for authorizing Arrangements in reference to "The Improved Postal and Passenger Communication between England and Ireland Act, 1855;" (Note: Improved Postal and Passenger Communication between England and Ireland Act 1855 (18 & 19 Vict. c. clxxii)) and for other Purposes.
| St. Leonard, Shoreditch Act 1858 (repealed) | 21 & 22 Vict. c. cxxxii | 23 July 1858 |
An Act for the Establishment of a Board of Guardians of the Poor in the Parish of Saint Leonard, Shoreditch, in the County of Middlesex; and for other Purposes with respect to the Parish. (Repealed by London Government (Borough of Wandsworth) Order in Council 1901 (SR&O 1901/222))
| Stockton and Middlesbrough Waterworks Act 1858 | 21 & 22 Vict. c. cxxxiii | 23 July 1858 |
An Act to consolidate and amend the Acts relating to the Stockton, Middlesbrough, and Yarm Water Company; to change the Name of the Company, and authorize the Construction of additional Works, and the raising of further Monies; and for other Purposes.
| North Yorkshire and Cleveland Railway Act 1858 | 21 & 22 Vict. c. cxxxiv | 23 July 1858 |
An Act to enable the North Yorkshire and Cleveland Railway Company to construct a new Branch from their Railway; to make a Deviation in the Main Line and other Works; to alter and amend the Acts relating to the Company; and for other Purposes.
| Severn Valley Railway Act 1858 | 21 & 22 Vict. c. cxxxv | 23 July 1858 |
An Act for making further Provision with respect to the Severn Valley Railway, in order to the Completion thereof; and for other Purposes.
| Manchester South Junction and Altrincham Railway Act 1858 | 21 & 22 Vict. c. cxxxvi | 23 July 1858 |
An Act to improve the Management of the Manchester South Junction and Altrincham Railway.
| Redditch Railway Act 1858 | 21 & 22 Vict. c. cxxxvii | 23 July 1858 |
An Act to authorize the Construction of a Railway from Redditch to the Midland Railway.
| Great Southern Railway of India Act 1858 (repealed) | 21 & 22 Vict. c. cxxxviii | 2 August 1858 |
An Act to incorporate and regulate the Great Southern of India Railway Company, and for other Purposes connected therewith. (Repealed by Statute Law (Repeals) Act 2013 (c. 2))
| Plymouth Great Western Dock Act 1858 | 21 & 22 Vict. c. cxxxix | 2 August 1858 |
An Act for extending the Powers of the Plymouth Great Western Dock Company, and for other Purposes.
| Middlesbrough Improvement Act 1858 (repealed) | 21 & 22 Vict. c. cxl | 2 August 1858 |
An Act to alter and improve the Boundaries of the Municipal Borough and District of Middlesbrough; to enable the Local Board of Health of the District to enlarge the Market Place; to enable the Corporation to construct Landing Places on the North Side of the River Tees, and to establish a public Passage up and over the said River; to transfer the Powers of the Burial Board to the Local Board; and to confer other Powers on the Local Board and the Corporation; and for other Purposes. (Repealed by Middlesbrough Corporation Act 1933 (23 & 24 Geo. 5. c. lxxxiii))
| Tees Conservancy Act 1858 | 21 & 22 Vict. c. cxli | 2 August 1858 |
An Act to confer additional Powers on the Tees Conservancy Commissioners; to regulate the Fisheries in the River Tees; to vest the Anchorage and Plankage Dues in the said Commissioners; to alter and amend their existing Acts; and for other Purposes.
| Worcester and Hereford Railway Act 1858 | 21 & 22 Vict. c. cxlii | 2 August 1858 |
An Act to extend the Time for making the Worcester and Hereford Railway, and for granting further Powers with respect to that Undertaking.
| Lancashire and Yorkshire and East Lancashire Railway Act 1858 | 21 & 22 Vict. c. cxliii | 2 August 1858 |
An Act to make further Provisions for vesting the Sheffield, Rotherham, Barnsley, Wakefield, Huddersfield, and Goole Railway in the Lancashire and Yorkshire Railway Company, and for other Purposes.
| Limerick and Castle Connell Railway (Killaloe Extension) Act 1858 | 21 & 22 Vict. c. cxliv | 2 August 1858 |
An Act for enabling the Limerick and Castle Connell Railway Company to extend their Railway from Castle Connell to Killaloe; to issue Preference Shares; and for other Purposes.
| West End of London and Clapham and Norwood Junction Railway Abandonment Act 1858 (repealed) | 21 & 22 Vict. c. cxlv | 2 August 1858 |
An Act for the Abandonment of the West End of London and Clapham and Norwood Junction Railway, and for other Purposes. (Repealed by Statute Law (Repeals) Act 2013 (c. 2))
| South Wales Railway Act 1858 | 21 & 22 Vict. c. cxlvi | 2 August 1858 |
An Act to enable the South Wales Railway Company to acquire additional Lands at Newport; and for other Purposes.
| Vale of Towy Railway (Leasing) Act 1858 | 21 & 22 Vict. c. cxlvii | 2 August 1858 |
An Act for authorizing a Lease of the Vale of Towy Railway to the Llanelly Railway and Dock Company.
| Atlantic Telegraph Amendment Act 1858 | 21 & 22 Vict. c. cxlviii | 2 August 1858 |
An Act for enabling the Atlantic Telegraph Company to create and issue Preference Capital, for the Extension of Borrowing Powers, and Amendment of Act.
| Clyde Navigation Consolidation Act 1858 | 21 & 22 Vict. c. cxlix | 2 August 1858 |
An Act to consolidate and amend the Acts relating to the River Clyde and Harbour of Glasgow.
| Warrington and Stockport Railway Capital Act 1858 | 21 & 22 Vict. c. cl | 2 August 1858 |
An Act for limiting, defining, and regulating the Capital and Debt of the Warrington and Stockport Railway Company; for amending the Acts relating to the Company, and conferring on them further Powers; and for other Purposes relating to the Company.

=== Private acts ===
| Short title | Citation | Royal assent |
Long title
| Darley's Estate Act 1858 | 21 & 22 Vict. c. 1 Pr. | 12 July 1858 |
An Act for enabling Mining Leases to be granted of an Estate in the North Riding of Yorkshire, late of Henry Darley Esquire, deceased, and for other Purposes, and of which the Short Title is "Darley's Estate Act, 1858."
| Viscount Keith's Estate Act 1858 | 21 & 22 Vict. c. 2 Pr. | 12 July 1858 |
An Act to confirm certain Arrangements with regard to the Trust Estate of the late George Viscount Keith, and to enable his Trustees to carry the same into effect.
| Westminster Palace Hotel Company's Act 1858 | 21 & 22 Vict. c. 3 Pr. | 23 July 1858 |
An Act for confirming and giving effect to an Agreement for a Lease by the Westminster Improvement Commissioners of Land in Victoria Street and Tothill Street in the City of Westminster to the Westminster Palace Hotel Company, Limited, and of which the Short Title is "Westminster Palace Hotel Company's Act, 1868."
| Fife Estates Improvement Act 1858 | 21 & 22 Vict. c. 4 Pr. | 23 July 1858 |
An Act to authorize the raising of Money to be expended in permanent Improvements on the Entailed Estates of Braco, Marr, Carraldstoun, and others, and the granting of Feus and long Leases of Parts of the said Estates.
| Holroyd Estate Act 1858 | 21 & 22 Vict. c. 5 Pr. | 23 July 1858 |
An Act for vesting Estates of the late Mr. Henry Holroyd deceased in Trustees for Sale, and for authorizing Grants in Fee and Building Leases for long Terms of Years of the same Estates; and for other Purposes.
| Sir Benjamin Hall's Estate Act 1858 | 21 & 22 Vict. c. 6 Pr. | 23 July 1858 |
An Act to grant further Powers and to make further Provisions in respect to the Estates subject to the Trusts of the Will of Benjamin Hall Esquire, deceased.
| Davidson's Estate Act 1858 | 21 & 22 Vict. c. 7 Pr. | 2 August 1858 |
An Act for authorizing the Trustees of the late James Davidson of Ruchill to sell Part of his Lands of Ruehill, Garrioch, and Balgray in the County of Lanark, and to reinvest the Prices of such Lands; and for other Purposes.
| Glasgow College Estate Act 1858 | 21 & 22 Vict. c. 8 Pr. | 2 August 1858 |
An Act for regulating the Dundonald Bursaries in the University and College of Glasgow, and for other Purposes.
| Ray Estate Act 1858 | 21 & 22 Vict. c. 9 Pr. | 2 August 1858 |
An Act for authorizing Mining, Building, and other Leases, the obtaining of the Enfranchisement of Copyholds and the Renewal of Leases, and the making of Partitions, Sales, and Exchanges of the Estates devised and bequeathed by the Will of Henry Belward Ray Esquire, deceased; and for other Purposes.
| Stearne's Charities Act 1858 | 21 & 22 Vict. c. 10 Pr. | 2 August 1858 |
An Act to amend an Act of the Parliament of Ireland passed in the Eleventh and Twelfth Years of the Reign of King George the Third, intituled "An Act for vesting the Estate of the Right Reverend Father in God Doctor John Stearne, late Lord Bishop of Clogher, deceased, in Trustees, in trust for carrying the charitable and other Bequests of his Will into execution." (Note: Stearne's Estate Act 1771 (11 & 12 Geo. 3. c. 5 Pr. (I)))
| Actons' Naturalization Act Amendment Act 1858 (Note: This act was not printed by the Queen's Printer.) | 21 & 22 Vict. c. 11 Pr. | 11 May 1858 |
An Act to repeal so much of an Act passed in the Seventh Year of the Reign of His late Majesty King William the Fourth and in the First Year of the Reign of Her present Majesty, intituled "An Act for naturalizing Dame Marie Louise Pelline De Dalberg Acton and her infant Son Sir John Emerich Edward Dalberg Acton Baronet," (Note: Actons' Naturalization Act 1837 (7 Will. 4 & 1 Vict. c. 58 Pr.)) as enacts that the said Sir John Emerich Edward Dalberg Acton Baronet shall not thereby be enabled to be of the Privy Council, or a Member of either House of Parliament, or to take any Office or Place of Trust, either Civil or Military, or to have any Grant of Lands, Tenements, or Hereditaments from the Crown, to himself or any other Person or Persons in trust for him.

=== Sources ===
- A Collection of the Public General Statutes Passed in the Twenty-First and Twenty-Second Years of the Reign of Her Majesty Queen Victoria. London: Eyre & Spottiswoode. 1858 – via Internet Archive.
- A Collection of the Public General Statutes Passed in the Twenty-First and Twenty-Second Years of the Reign of Her Majesty Queen Victoria. London: Eyre & Spottiswoode. 1858 – via Google Books.
- Local and Personal Laws – via Google Books.
- Local and Personal Laws – via Google Books.
- Journals of the House of Commons (PDF). Vol. 113.

== See also ==
- List of acts of the Parliament of the United Kingdom
