= Local board of health =

Type of local authority in England and Wales 1848–1894

A local board of health (or simply a local board) was a local authority in urban areas of England and Wales from 1848 to 1894. They were formed in response to cholera epidemics and were given powers to control sewers, clean the streets, regulate environmental health risks including slaughterhouses and ensure the proper supply of water to their districts. Local boards were eventually merged with the corporations of municipal boroughs in 1873, or became urban districts in 1894.

== Public Health Act 1848 ==
Public Health Act 1848 (Note: Section 3.)
- Act of Parliament
- Parliament of the United Kingdom
- Long title: An Act for promoting the Public Health.
- Citation: 11 & 12 Vict. c. 63
- Territorial extent: United Kingdom

Dates
- Royal assent: 31 August 1848
- Commencement: 31 August 1848 (Note: The Acts of Parliament (Commencement) Act 1793.)
- Repealed: 11 August 1875
Other legislation
| Amended by | Tithe Rating Act 1851; Local Government Act 1858; Public Health Act 1872 |
| Repealed by | Public Health Act 1875 |

Status: Repealed

Text of statute as originally enacted

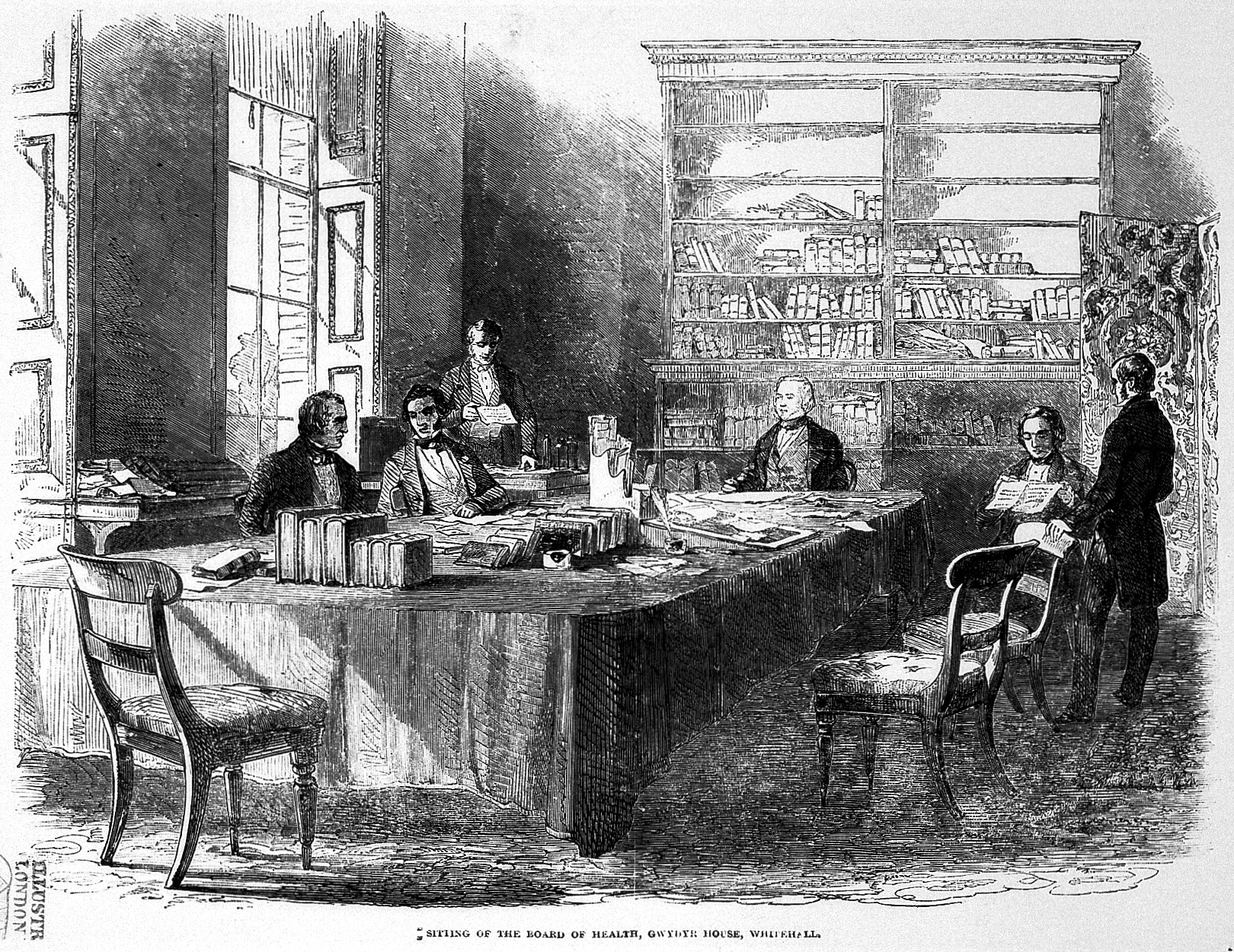
Sitting of the Board of Health, at Gwydyr House, Whitehall, in 1849

The first local boards were created under the Public Health Act 1848 (11 & 12 Vict. c. 63), also known as the Health of Towns Act 1848. The aim of the act was to improve the sanitary condition of towns and populous places in England and Wales by placing: the supply of water; sewerage; drainage; cleansing; paving, and environmental health regulation under a single local body. The act could be applied to any place in England and Wales except the City of London and some other areas in the Metropolis already under the control of sewer commissioners.

The act was passed by the Whig government of Lord John Russell, in response to the urging of Edwin Chadwick. This was supported by reports, from the Royal Commission on the Health of Towns (formed in 1843) and local branches of the Health of Towns Association (formed in 1844), of poor and insanitary conditions in many UK cities.

=== General Board of Health ===
The act created a General Board of Health as a central authority to administer the act. There were three commissioners: the president of the board being the First Commissioner of Her Majesty's Woods and Forests, Land Revenues, Works and Buildings, the other two members being appointed by warrant. The board was originally to be dissolved after five years, but acts of parliament were passed annually allowing for its continuation.

Chadwick was appointed a commissioner, and the board was strongly associated with him.

In 1852, Edward Gotto was employed to carry out the national General Board of Health Survey.

The board finally ceased to exist on 1 September 1858.

=== Forming a local board of health ===
Local boards could be formed in two ways:

- By a petition of one-tenth of the inhabitants rated to relief of the poor in any city, town, borough (municipal or parliamentary), parish or place with a defined boundary not having less than 30 such qualified ratepayers.
- By the General Board if the death rate exceeded twenty-three in a thousand in any place.

In the latter case a superintending inspector appointed by the General Board would hold an inquiry into the sewerage, drainage, supply of water, state of burial grounds and other matters relating to the sanitary condition of the town, and where necessary define boundaries for the district of the local board.

Where the boundaries of a proposed local board's district were the same as an existing local unit, the act was applied by Order in Council. Where a new district was created this was done by provisional order of the General Board, confirmed by Parliament.

=== Membership of a local board ===
Under amendments to the Public Health Act introduced in 1855 during the tenure of Sir Benjamin Hall as President of the Board of Health, members of local boards were either:

- Selected by the corporations of municipal boroughs
- Elected by owners of property and by rate payers

Where a local board district coincided with a borough, or was entirely within a borough's limits, all the members were selected by the corporation. Where a district was entirely outside a municipality, all the members were elected. In districts which were partly in and partly outside a borough the board had a mixture of selected and elected members. Selected members did not have to be members of the corporation. Borough mayors were ex officio board members.

Those entitled to elect board members could have multiple votes depending on how much property they owned. This ranged from one vote for owners of property worth less than £50, to six votes for those holding more than £250 of property. It followed that board members were generally wealthy property owners or members of the professions.

=== Powers of a local board ===
The powers and duties of a local board of health were enumerated in the act:

- Employees: A local board of health was allowed to appoint a number of employees, including a surveyor, a clerk, a treasurer, and an officer of health (who had to be a qualified doctor). It was compulsory for the board to appoint an inspector of nuisances (sanitary inspector) to investigate complaints and take action against 'nuisances' (nuisances was a very broad concept encompassing a wide range of environmental public health problems: such as unsanitary dwellings, accumulations of refuse and sewage, smoke dust and smells and industrial emissions, polluted water, noise, adulterated food, slaughterhouse issues etc.).
- Sewers: The local board took over ownership of all public sewers in its district. Where private sewers operated for profit, the local board could purchase them.
- Street cleansing: The local board was required to clean the streets in its district, removing dust, ashes, rubbish, filth, dung and soil.
- Public lavatories: The local board could provide "public necessities" (as the act called them).
- Slaughterhouses: The local board was to regulate slaughterhouses, and was allowed to provide such facilities itself.
- Street paving: The local board took over the public streets in the district, and could also require that private streets be paved.
- Pleasure grounds: The local boards were allowed to provide and lay out pleasure grounds.
- Water supply: The local board was allowed to supply water, but only if a private company could not provide the service.
- Burials: The local board was allowed to provide houses for the reception of the dead prior to burial. They could also apply to the General Board to have an existing graveyard closed.
- Land: The local board could purchase land.

== Local Government Act 1858 ==
Local Government Act 1858 (Note: Section 1.)
- Act of Parliament
- Parliament of the United Kingdom
- Long title: An Act to amend the Public Health Act, 1848, and to make further Provision for the Local Government of Towns and populous Districts.
- Citation: 21 & 22 Vict. c. 98
- Territorial extent: England and Wales

Dates
- Royal assent: 2 August 1858
- Commencement: 1 September 1858 (Note: Section 5.)
- Repealed: 11 August 1875
Other legislation
| Amends | Public Health Act 1848 |
| Amended by | Local Government Act (1858) Amendment Act 1861; Local Government Act Amendment Act 1863 |
| Repealed by | Public Health Act 1875 |

Status: Repealed

Text of statute as originally enacted

The 1848 act was replaced by the Local Government Act 1858 (21 & 22 Vict. c. 98). The act came into force in all existing local board of health districts on 1 September 1858. The act made some changes to the procedure for constituting a local board and gave them some additional powers. There was also a change in nomenclature: the authorities created by the 1858 act were simply entitled "local boards" and their areas as "local government districts".

=== The Local Government Act Office and the Local Government Board ===
When the General Board of Health was abolished in 1858 its responsibilities in respect of local government passed to the Secretary of State of the Home Department, in whose department a Local Government Act Office was formed to administer the local boards. In 1871 a separate agency was again formed entitled the Local Government Board, with a President who was frequently a Cabinet member. The Local Government Board also took over the duties of the Poor Law Board.

=== Constituting local boards ===
The procedure for adopting the act and constituting a local board was laid out in sections 12 – 17 of the act, and was similar to that in the 1848 act.

Changes made included:

- Improvement commissioners could adopt the act for their district, the board of commissioners becoming in addition the local board.
- Petitions from ten per cent of the ratepayers of places other than those with a "known or defined boundary" to adopt the act were now made to the Secretary of State. If one in twenty ratepayers objected to the formation of a local board they now had the right to petition against it.
- The power to create a local board where there was excess mortality was abolished.

The method of electing members of the board remained the same, although existing or new boards could now be divided into wards.

=== Additional powers ===
The Town Police Clauses Act 1847 (10 & 11 Vict. c. 89) had included model clauses for the government of towns which could be adopted in all or in part by existing borough corporations, local boards of health or improvement commissioners. The application of these was very uneven, so they were incorporated into the 1858 act, all local boards gaining these powers.

Areas covered by the clauses were:

- Removal of obstructions and nuisances in the street
- Fires and fire prevention
- Provision and control of places of public resort
- Regulation of hackney carriages
- Provision of public bathing houses
- Naming streets and numbering houses
- Improving the line of streets
- Removal of ruinous or dangerous buildings
- Provision of public clocks

The local board also took over any lamps, lamp posts and gas posts provided by the Lighting and Watching Act 1833, and was given a new power to provide a market place where one was required or inadequate.

== Number of local boards ==
The number of local boards peaked at 721 in 1873. In that year the Public Health Act 1872 merged local boards into municipal boroughs and improvement commissioners where they shared the same district. 419 of the local boards had been formed under the Public Health Act 1848, the remaining 302 under the Local Government Act 1858.

The number of local boards was inflated in 1862–63, as communities adopted the act in order to avoid being grouped into highway districts under the Highways Act 1862. Many of these local government districts had a population of fewer than 500, and several fewer than 100. Further legislation was passed in 1863 to limit the population of a new local government district to 3,000 or more. Some of these small authorities survived as urban districts until the county review orders of the 1930s.

== Sanitary districts and urban districts ==
The Public Health Act 1875 (38 & 39 Vict. c. 55) designated local government districts as urban sanitary districts, with the local board becoming the urban sanitary authority. The titles of the district and board did not change however, the local board assuming extra duties as a sanitary authority.

Local boards and local government districts were finally abolished by the Local Government Act 1894 (56 & 57 Vict. c. 73), when all urban sanitary districts became urban districts. A new urban district council was to govern the district. The new council was to be directly elected by all those entitled to voted in parliamentary elections, replacing the weighted property voting system used for local boards.

== See also ==
- Local boards formed in England and Wales 1848–94
