= Durham County Palatine Act 1858 =

Act of the Parliament of the United Kingdom

Durham County Palatine Act 1858 (Note: The citation of this act by this short title was authorised by section 1 of, and the First Schedule to, the Short Titles Act 1896. Due to the repeal of those provisions, it is now authorised by section 19(2) of the Interpretation Act 1978.)
- Act of Parliament
- Parliament of the United Kingdom
- Long title: An Act to amend the Provisions of an Act of the Sixth Year of King William the Fourth, for separating the Palatine Jurisdiction of the County Palatine of Durham from the Bishoprick of Durham; and to make further Provision with respect to the Jura Regalia of the said County.
- Citation: 21 & 22 Vict. c. 45
- Territorial extent: United Kingdom

Dates
- Royal assent: 23 July 1858
- Commencement: 23 July 1858 (Note: The Acts of Parliament (Commencement) Act 1793.)
Other legislation
Amended by	Church Commissioners Measure 1947; Crown Estate Act 1956; Crown Estate Act 1961
Relates to	Durham (County Palatine) Act 1836

Status: Amended

Text of statute as originally enacted

Revised text of statute as amended

Text of the Durham County Palatine Act 1858 as in force today (including any amendments) within the United Kingdom, from legislation.gov.uk.

The Durham County Palatine Act 1858 (21 & 22 Vict. c. 45) is an act of the Parliament of the United Kingdom.

== Section 1 – Definition of the words "the county of Durham" ==
Section 1 of the act reads:

In this Act the words "the county of Durham" shall have the same interpretation and meaning as in the said recited Act.

"The said recited Act" means the Durham (County Palatine) Act 1836 (6 & 7 Will. 4. c. 19) which was recited in the preamble. Section 7 of that act contained a definition of the expression "County of Durham".

== Section 2 – The interest of the bishoprick of Durham in the foreshores of the county of Durham vested in Her Majesty ==
Section 2 of the act now reads:

. . . nothing in this Act contained shall extend to the island called Holy Island, situate in that part of the County Palatine of Durham called Islandshire . . .

The words omitted were repealed by section 9(2) of and Part I of the Third Schedule to, the Crown Estate Act 1961.

== Section 3 – Certain leases by the Bishop confirmed, but rents received under some of them to be apportioned ==
Section 3 of the act was repealed by section 9(2) of and Part I of the Third Schedule to, the Crown Estate Act 1961.

== Section 4 – Rents and proceeds from the foreshores of Durham to be divided equally between the Crown and the Ecclesiastical Commissioners ==
Section 4 of the act provides that:

All rents and profits and other monies which may be received by the [Crown Estate Commissioners], under the provisions of this Act or otherwise howsoever, from, and the proceeds of any sales or dispositions made by them or either of them of, any part of the bed or shores of any navigable river so far as the tide flows, or of the shores of the sea below high-water mark, or of any inclosures, embankments, and encroachments made therefrom or thereupon respectively within the county of Durham, and after deducting thereout all costs, charges, and expenses in any wise incidental to the sale or management or recovery of such property, shall be divided into moieties; and one moiety of such rent, profits, monies, and proceeds shall be applied by the [Crown Estate Commissioners], as part of the hereditary possessions and land revenues of the Crown, . . .; and the other moiety thereof shall be paid by the same Commissioners to the Ecclesiastical Commissioners for England; but, notwithstanding this provision for the apportionment of the said rents, profits, monies, and proceeds, the said Ecclesiastical Commissioners shall have no right to interfere with the management or disposition of such property, which shall be managed and disposed of in all respects as part and parcel of the hereditary possessions of the Crown, and as if no such provision as last aforesaid had been made.

The references to the Crown Estate Commissioners were substituted by virtue of article 2 of the Forestry (Title of Commissioners of Woods) Order 1924 (SR&O 1924/1370), sections 1(1) and (7) of the Crown Estate Act 1956 and section 1(1) of, and paragraph 4(1) of the second schedule to, the Crown Estate Act 1961.

The words "in the manner prescribed by an Act passed in the Tenth Year of the Reign of His late Majesty King George the Fourth, chapter fifty" (which referred to the Crown Lands Act 1829) were repealed by section 9(2) of and part I of the third schedule to, the Crown Estate Act 1961.

References to the Ecclesiastical Commissioners for England

The references to the Ecclesiastical Commissioners in this section must be construed as references to the Church Commissioners

== Subsequent developments ==
The preamble to, and sections 5 and 6 of, the act were repealed by section 9(2) of and part I of the third schedule to, the Crown Estate Act 1961, which came into force on 27 July 1961.
