= County Palatine of Durham =

Historic county of England with unique status

County Palatine of Durham and Sadberge
- 883–1836
- Coat of arms

- The wards and exclaves of the palatinate. Bedlingtonshire was part of Chester-le-Street Ward, and Craikshire was part of Darlington Ward.
- Status: Prince-Bishopric
- Capital: Durham
- Government: Ecclesiastical principality
- History
  - Community of St Cuthbert established: 684
  - Move to Chester-le-Street; Lands granted south of Tyne: 883
  - Move to Durham: 995
  - Bishops' palatine powers recognised: 1293
  - The Act of Resumption curtails civil and judicial independence in the palatinate: 1537
  - Durham returns its first members to Parliament: 1654
  - Tenures Abolition Act ends the bishop's rights as chief feudal lord in the Palatinate: 1660
  - County Palatine formally dissolved: 1836
Preceded by	Succeeded by
Liberty of Durham	County Durham

The former exchequer on Palace Green, Durham, (right) is the only surviving medieval administrative building of the palatinate. It was built by Robert Neville, bishop 1438–1457.

The County Palatine of Durham, also known as the County Palatine of Durham and Sadberge, was a jurisdiction in the North of England, within which the bishop of Durham had rights usually exclusive to the monarch. It developed from the Liberty of Durham, which emerged in the Anglo-Saxon period. The gradual acquisition of powers by the bishops led to Durham being recognised as a palatinate by the late thirteenth century, one of several such counties in England during the Middle Ages. The county palatine had its own government and institutions, which broadly mirrored those of the monarch and included several judicial courts. From the sixteenth century the palatine rights of the bishops were gradually reduced, and were finally abolished in 1836. The last palatine institution to survive was the Court of Chancery of the County Palatine of Durham and Sadberge, which was abolished in 1972.

The palatine included the contemporary ceremonial county of Durham except southern Teesdale, the parts of Tyne and Wear south of the Tyne, and had exclaves in Northumberland and North Yorkshire around the island of Lindisfarne and the settlements of Bedlington, Norham, and Crayke.

== History ==
=== Early history ===
The County Palatine of Durham emerged from the liberty known variously as the "Liberty of Durham", "Liberty of St Cuthbert's Land", "The lands of St. Cuthbert between Tyne and Tees", or "The Liberty of Haliwerfolc", the latter translating to "district of the holy saint's folk". St. Cuthbert gained a reputation as being fiercely protective of his domain. The origins of the Liberty trace back to the year 684, when King Ecgfrith of Northumbria bestowed a significant territory upon St. Cuthbert, following the latter's election as the Bishop of Lindisfarne.

The Viking invasions led to the shattering of the Kingdom of Northumbria into a series of successor polities, chief of which were the Kingdom of Jórvík and the Earldom of Bamburgh, or North English Kingdom. Between them emerged the Community of St. Cuthbert, which acquired expansive estates situated between the rivers Tyne and Tees, known as the Patrimony of St. Cuthbert.

This process of territorial expansion began under the leadership of Bishop Ecgred, who acquired two substantial blocks in the south-east and south-west regions of the designated area between 830 and 845.

In a strategic move around the year 883, the diocese of Lindisfarne was translated to Chester-le-Street. The translation was facilitated by Guthred, the Viking King of Northumbria, who granted the Community of St. Cuthbert the region between the Tyne and Wear. Combined with the earlier estates between Wear and Tees, as well as further acquisitions between the Wear and Derwent, these estates already formed an ecclesiastical patrimony extending across the region that would become County Durham.

Max Adams argues that the Community had taken up "a buffer position between the two rival kingdoms", operating as an autonomous ecclesiastical lordship between the Anglian rulers of Bamburgh and the Scandinavian kingdom based in York, while remaining "very much as the ally of the Men of York". Similarly, Adrian Green and A. J. Pollard note that, while Scandinavian settlement and cultural influence penetrated only a short distance north of the Tees, the Scandinavian Kings recognised the Community as a client ruler governing the district stretching to the Tyne, with both the rulers at Bamburgh and the Community of St Cuthbert claiming to represent the remnant of the old Northumbrian kingdom.

=== Establishment and consolidation ===
Following the final defeat of Scandinavian York in 954, Northumbria would permanently come under the authority of the West Saxon Kings of England but was only nominally subject to their power. The lands of the Kingdom of York would eventually be incorporated in the form of the shire of Yorkshire; however, the West Saxon Kings did not attempt to extend their direct rule beyond the Tees.

North of the Tees, standard English administrative structures would not be extended to the region before the reign of Henry II. Unlike the rest of pre-Conquest England, the region operated entirely outside the royal fiscal and administrative framework; it lacked tax assessments (hides or carucates), royal reeves, royal mints, burhs, and royal demesne lands prior to the 1090s. Moreover, it was wholly omitted from the Domesday Book. Instead of direct royal governance, regional authority remained divided between the House of Bamburgh north of the Tyne and the Community of St Cuthbert in the lands between the Tyne and Tees.

When William the Conqueror became the king of England in 1066, he quickly realised the need to control Northumbria to protect his kingdom from Scottish invasion. In 1075, shortly after the Norman conquest, William the Conqueror allowed Bishop Walcher to purchase the earldom of Northumbria after its previous holder, Waltheof, rebelled against the king. This may have marked the beginning of the bishops' temporal authority, with the Bishop of Durham essentially inheriting the powers of the earl. However, David D. Hall argues that the Patrimony of St. Cuthbert between the Tyne and Tees was likely already immune from comital and regal action by the tenth century, noting that comital lands between the Tyne and Tees were administered as the separate wapentake of Sadberge, which occupied several exclaves along the north bank of the Tees that had not yet been acquired by the Patrimony. Instead, Hall posits that the Bishop's temporal powers had emerged by the early twelfth century as a result of internal developments within the Liberty, with the Bishop emerging as a princely authority over the pre-existing Patrimony. A shift occurred following the Norman invasion, when Bishop William de Saint Calais replaced the secular clerks of the Community with Benedictine monks in 1083. This ultimately led to a division within the Patrimony between the Bishop and the Monastic Convent around the year 1100; the Bishop's emerging authority over temporal and spiritual rights was continually challenged and negotiated by the Prior and convent throughout the twelfth century.

The machinery of government itself was slow to extend itself to Northern England, and these lands were under constant threat of rebellion from displaced English thanes or of invasion from Scotland. In the twelfth century, the shire system was extended north of the Tees and the county of Northumberland was formed, but the authority of the sheriff of Northumberland and his officials over the Liberty was disputed by the Bishops. The crown still regarded Durham as falling within Northumberland until the late thirteenth century.

Disputes with the officials of Northumberland were not resolved until 1293, when Bishop Antony Bek and his steward failed to attend a summons by the justices of Northumberland, and the case eventually reached Parliament. There, Bek argued that "from time immemorial it had been widely known that the sheriff of Northumberland was not sheriff of Durham nor entered within that liberty as sheriff", and that Durham was independent of any other county. These arguments appear to have been accepted, as by the 14th century Durham was considered a County Palatine which received royal mandates direct. The jurisdiction of the bishops was also expanded during this period when the wapentake of Sadberge was purchased by bishop Hugh de Puiset in 1189. It was gradually incorporated into Durham, but retained separate assizes until 1586.

=== Decline and abolition ===
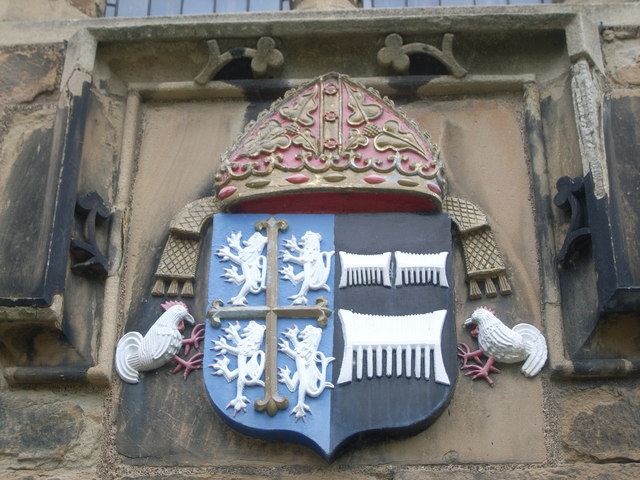
The coat of arms of Cuthbert Tunstall, bishop 1530–51 and 1554–59, on Durham Castle. They combine the arms of the diocese (left) with Tunstall's personal arms (right). Above the shield is a mitre encircled by a coronet, symbolising the bishops' spiritual and temporal power.

The later history of the palatinate is characterised by the Crown and parliament slowly diminishing the powers of the bishops and incorporating the county into the regular system of local government in England. This process began in 1536, when the Act of Resumption deprived the bishop of the power to pardon offences or to appoint judicial officers and mandated that the county's legal system would in future be run in the name of the king, rather than the bishop. In March 1553 the diocese was briefly abolished; the bishop, Cuthbert Tunstall, had been removed from office and imprisoned in 1552 because he did not support the religious policies of Edward VI's de facto regent, John Dudley. Mary I had restored both the diocese and Tunstall to office by April 1554, and in practice the abolition seems to have been ignored. In 1596, under Elizabeth I, restrictions were placed on the palatinate's court of chancery.

In 1646, the parliament of the Commonwealth of England again abolished the palatinate, but after the Stuart Restoration it was once again revived. In 1654, the palatinate sent its first members to the Parliament of England, two each for the city of Durham and the wider county; the bishops had previously put up strong opposition to a 1614 bill which would have given the city of Durham and Barnard Castle representation. By 1831, the county covered an area of 679,530 acres (2,750.0 km^{2}) and had a population of 253,910. These boundaries were used for parliamentary purposes until 1832, and for judicial and local government purposes until the coming into force of the Counties (Detached Parts) Act 1844, which merged most remaining exclaves with their surrounding county.

During the nineteenth century, several other Acts of Parliament were passed which affected the governance of Durham. The Durham (County Palatine) Act 1836 effectively abolished the palatine by transferring the bishop's remaining palatine rights to the Crown. Doubts about the construction of this Act led to the enactment of the Durham County Palatine Act 1858. Durham was included in the standardisation of English and Welsh local government enacted by the Local Government Act 1888, which created the Durham County Council. Durham maintained its own judicial identity until the Courts Act 1971 abolished its separate court of chancery.

== Administration ==
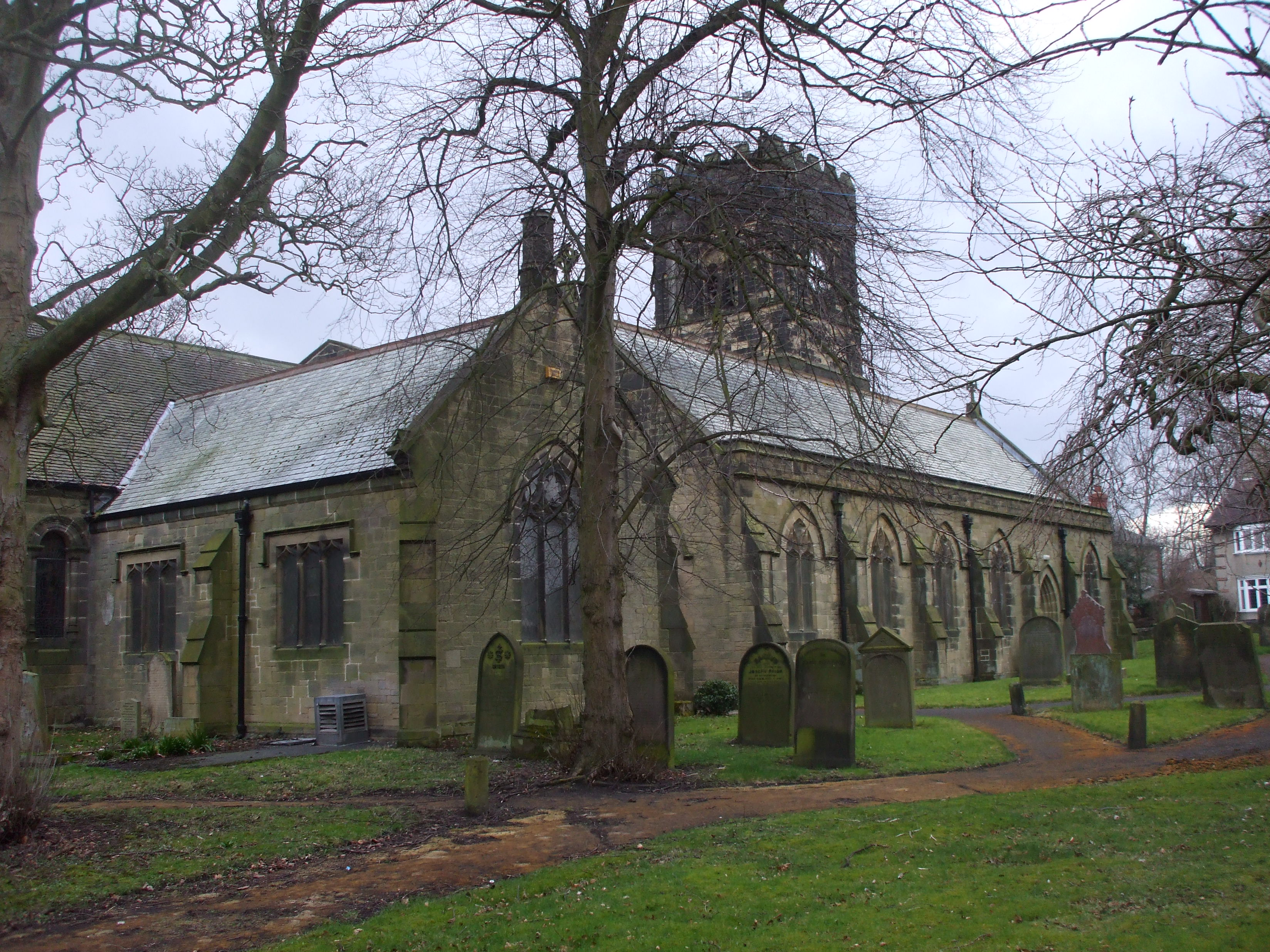
St Cuthbert's Church, Bedlington. Although considerably rebuilt, it retains a Norman chancel arch and other elements.

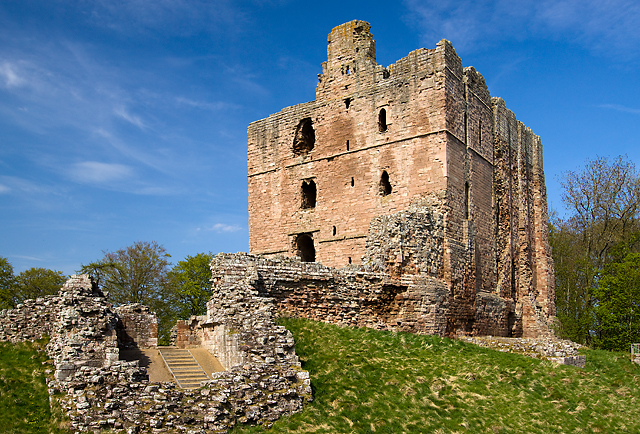
Norham Castle, in Norhamshire, was founded by Bishop Flambard in 1121, captured by Scotland in 1136 and 1138, and rebuilt by Bishop le Puiset in 1157. It was the bishops' main fortress on the Scottish border.

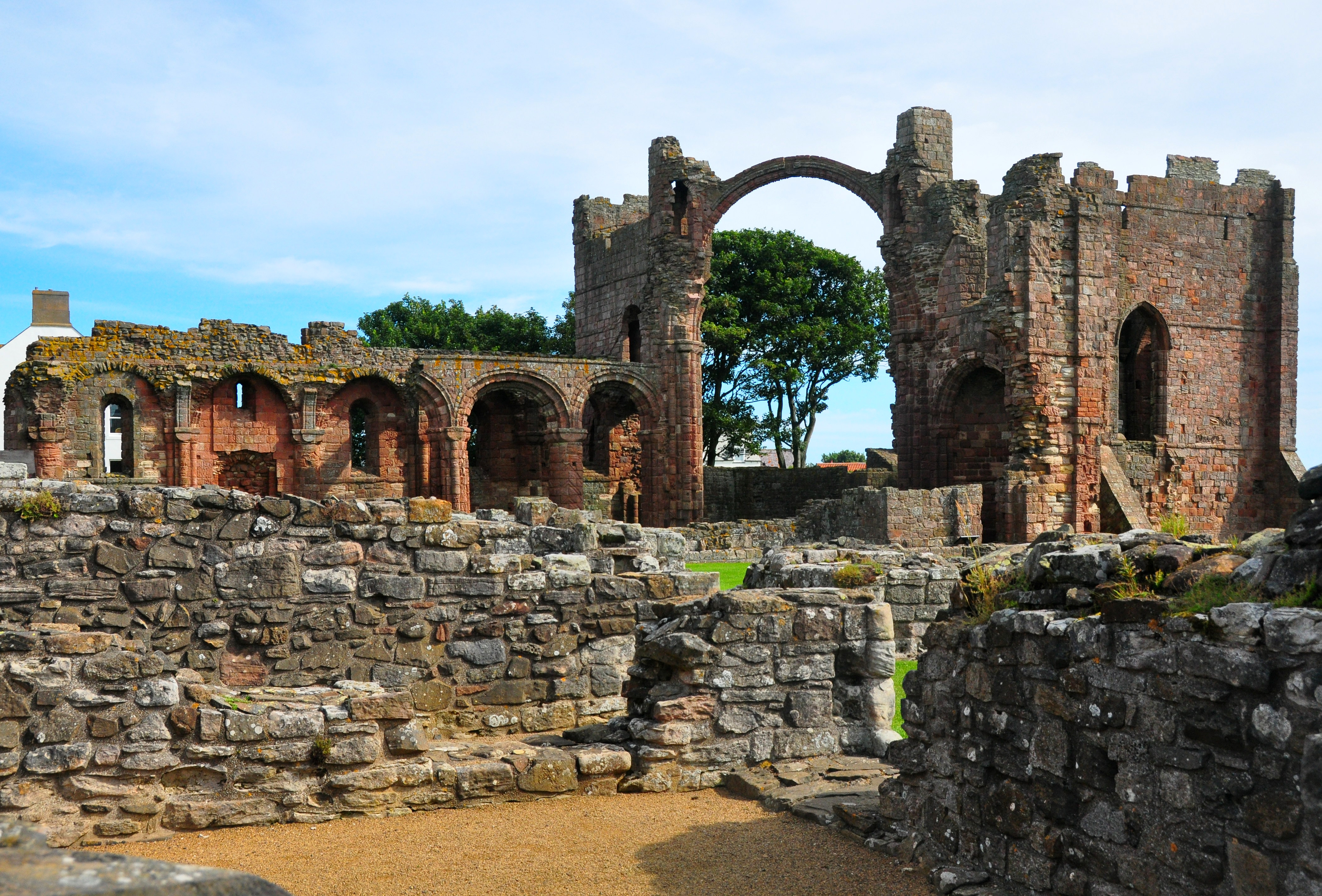
Lindisfarne Priory, in Islandshire. The island was the site of the diocese's original cathedral and was the original burial place of St Cuthbert. The present ruins are the remains of the monastery re-founded here in 1083 by Bishop St-Calais as a subordinate monastery to Durham.

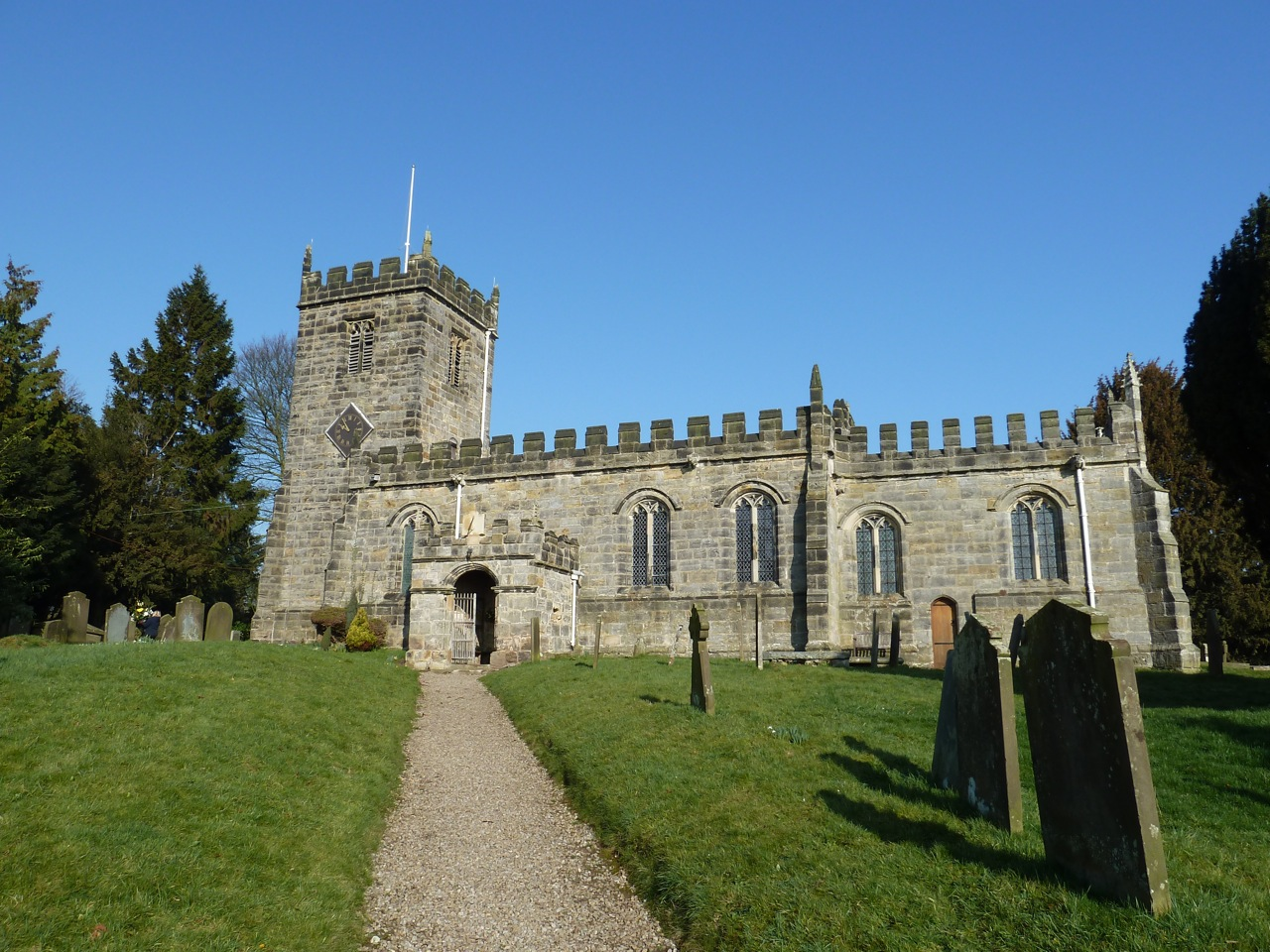
St Cuthbert's Church, Crayke. The bishops of Durham had a residence in the village, which was the centre of Craikshire.

At its greatest extent, the county palatine consisted of a large, contiguous territory around Durham and several exclaves to the north and south. The contiguous territory was bounded by the rivers Tyne and Derwent in the north, the North Sea to the east, the River Tees to the south, and the Pennines in the west. The exclaves were Bedlingtonshire, Islandshire and Norhamshire within Northumberland, and Craikshire within the North Riding of Yorkshire. Durham itself was divided by the 13th century into four "wards" (equivalent to hundreds) named after their chief towns: Chester-le-Street, Darlington, Easington and Stockton. Each had its own coroner and a three-weekly court.

The Prior of Durham ranked first among the bishop's barons. He had his own court, and almost exclusive jurisdiction over his men. There were ten palatinate barons in the 12th century, the most important being the Hyltons of Hylton Castle, the Bulmers of Brancepeth, the Conyers of Sockburne, the Hansards of Evenwood, and the Lumleys of Lumley Castle. The Neville family also owned large estates in the county, including Raby Castle.

=== Taxation ===
The principle that the King would not tax Durham may have been established as early as 685, when St. Cuthbert was made bishop of Lindisfarne, and successive bishops of the diocese acquired extensive estates with exemptions from tax. They also maintained a seignorial court, which implied exemption from interference by the king's officers. There is no evidence that the bishops paid danegeld, which was first collected in 991; after the Norman Conquest it became a regular tax based on the Domesday survey, which Durham was also omitted from.

Several documents survive which prove Durham's exemption from taxes, including two precepts from the reign of William II and charters from the reign of Henry II which exempt the palatine from a wide range of taxes and reaffirm similar privileges granted in the reigns of Henry I and William II. When the bishopric was vacant it was in included in the pipe rolls maintained by the English Exchequer, which show that it did not pay taxes such as carucage. When Henry II enforced the Assize of Clarendon in the palatinate he also stated that his actions should not be used as a precedent, implying that the exclusion of the king's justices was a privilege of the palatinate. It is not known whether palatinate would have been subject to the Saladin tithe, as bishop de Puiset pledged to go on crusade and was therefore exempt from paying it. During the vacancy which followed the death of bishop Philip of Poitou in 1208 King John appears to have raised money in the palatinate, but this was regarded as an infringement of local privilege.

=== Government and courts ===
The palatine had its own government, whose officers were ultimately appointed by the bishop. Until the 15th century the most important administrative officer was the steward, and the palatine also had a sheriff, coroners, a chamberlain and a chancellor. The palatine exchequer was organised in the 12th century. The palatine assembly represented the whole county, and dealt chiefly with fiscal questions. The bishop's council, consisting of the clergy, the sheriff and the barons, regulated the judicial affairs. The palatine eventually developed several courts, including chancery, common pleas, admiralty and marshalsea. The Court of the County of Durham was abolished by section 2 of the Durham (County Palatine) Act 1836, the Court of Chancery of the County Palatine of Durham and Sadberge was abolished by the Courts Act 1971, and the Court of Pleas of the County Palatine of Durham and Sadberge was abolished by the Supreme Court of Judicature Act 1873.

== St Cuthbert and the haliwerfolc ==
During the medieval period, St Cuthbert became politically important in defining the identity of the people living in the semi-autonomous region. Within this area the saint became a powerful symbol of the autonomy the region enjoyed. The inhabitants of the Palatinate became known as the "haliwerfolc", an Old English phrase which roughly translates as "people of the saint", and Cuthbert gained a reputation as being fiercely protective of his domain.

An example of Cuthbert's importance is the Battle of Neville's Cross in 1346, when the prior of Durham Cathedral received a vision of Cuthbert ordering him to take the corporax cloth of the saint and raise it on a spear point near the battlefield as a banner. Doing this, the prior and his monks found themselves protected "by the mediation of holy St Cuthbert and the presence of the said holy Relic."

Symeon of Durham related a tale of a tax gatherer named Ranulf, who was sent by William the Conqueror to force the people of the saint to contribute to the national revenue. St. Cuthbert, angry at this infringement of his liberties, "horribly visited" Ranulf, who was glad to escape alive from the bishopric. The tale, despite the fact it likely postdates the events described, is still of value as it shows the local notion of the bishop's privilege in the matter of taxation.

== Legacy ==
Several buildings related to the bishops of Durham and the palatinate survive, including the castles at Durham, Norham, and Bishop Auckland, and the exchequer building on Palace Green in Durham.

The County Palatine has been used by the tourism industry to promote Durham, often using the tagline 'land of the prince bishops'. The phrase can also be seen on road signs when entering the County Durham unitary authority.
