= Court of the County of Durham =

The Court of the County of Durham was a court that exercised jurisdiction within the County Palatine of Durham. It was abolished, subject to certain savings, on 5 July 1836.

The sole roll of this court known not to have been lost is DCM Misc Ch 5722. It includes material from the years 1403 and 1404.

== Abolition ==
Section 2 of the Durham (County Palatine) Act 1836 (6 & 7 Will. 4. c. 19) provided:

That from and after the Commencement of this Act all the Power, Authority, and Jurisdiction of the Court called "The Court of the County of Durham" and of the Clerk of the Court of the County of Durham as Judge of the same Court or otherwise shall cease and determine; subject nevertheless and without Prejudice to any Proceedings then depending in such Court, as to which the Authority and Jurisdiction of the said Court and of the present Clerk of the said Court shall continue in full Force and Effect, notwithstanding the passing of this Act; and in case of Death or Removal from Office of the present Clerk of the said Court whilst any such Proceedings as aforesaid shall be still depending therein, the Under Sheriff of the said County shall and may for the purpose of such Proceedings, act as Judge of the said Court, and exercise the same Power, Authority, and Jurisdiction as the present Clerk of the said Court might have exercised if still living and continuing in Office: Provided always that the Sheriff for the Time being of the said County Palatine shall and may have and exercise the same Power of holding a County Court, and the same Jurisdiction therein, as is usually had and exercised by Sheriffs of other Counties in England.

Compensation

See sections 4 and 5 of the Durham (County Palatine) Act 1836.

== See also ==
- Courts of the County Palatine of Durham
