= Durham (County Palatine) Act 1836 =

Act of the Parliament of the United Kingdom

Durham (County Palatine) Act 1836 (Note: The citation of this act by this short title was authorised by section 1 of, and the first schedule to, the Short Titles Act 1896, section 1 and the first schedule. Due to the repeal of those provisions it is now authorised by section 19(2) of the Interpretation Act 1978.)
- Act of Parliament
- Parliament of the United Kingdom
- Long title: An Act for separating the Palatine Jurisdiction of the County Palatine of Durham for the Bishoprick of Durham.
- Citation: 6 & 7 Will. 4. c. 19
- Territorial extent: United Kingdom

Dates
- Royal assent: 21 June 1836
- Commencement: 5 July 1836, except as otherwise provided for. (Note: Section 8.)
- Repealed: 27 May 1976
Other legislation
Amended by	Statute Law Revision Act 1874; Sheriffs Act 1887; Statute Law Revision Act 1890; Crown Estate Act 1961; Justices of the Peace Act 1968; Courts Act 1971
Repealed by	Statute Law (Repeals) Act 1976
Relates to	Durham County Palatine Act 1858

Status: Repealed

Text of statute as originally enacted

The Durham (County Palatine) Act 1836 (6 & 7 Will. 4. c. 19) was an act of the Parliament of the United Kingdom that abolished the temporal authority of the Bishop of Durham within the County Palatine of Durham, placing the county under lay administration. Previously, since 1075, the so-called prince-bishops had substantial powers as earls "with the right to raise an army, mint his own coins, and levy taxes".

Section 2 of the act also disbanded the Court of the County of Durham, appointing the High Sheriff as judge of a regular county court.

Doubts about the construction of this act led to the enactment of the Durham County Palatine Act 1858 (21 & 22 Vict. c. 45).

== Provisions ==
=== Section 2 – County court to cease ===
Section 2 of the act abolished the Court of the County of Durham and the office of the clerk of that court.

=== Section 7 – Extent of the words "County of Durham" ===
Section 7 of the act provide that:

That in the Interpretation of the Clauses and Provisions herein-before contained the Words "County of Durham" shall comprise and mean the County of Durham and Sadberge, including the detached parts of Craikshire, Bedlingtonshire, Norhamshire, Allertonshire, and Islandshire, and all other Places heretofore within the Jurisdiction of the Bishop of Durham in right of the said County Palatine.

This definition is referred to in section 1 of the Durham County Palatine Act 1858 (21 & 22 Vict. c. 45).

== Subsequent developments ==
The proviso to section 1 of the act was repealed by section 56(4) of, and part II of schedule 11 to, the Courts Act 1971, which came into force on 1 January 1972. The repeal was consequential on the abolition of the Court of Chancery of the County Palatine of Durham and Sadberge by section 41 of that act.

The words from "and all forfeitures" to "in right of the same" in section 1, and section 9, of the act was repealed by section 9(2) of, and part I of the third schedule to, the Crown Estate Act 1961, which came into force on 27 July 1961.

Section 3 of the act was repealed by section 8(2) of, and part II of schedule 5 to, the Justices of the Peace Act 1968, which came into force on 1 February 1969.

In a report dated 28 October 1975, the Law Commission and the Scottish Law Commission said that the unrepealed residue of this act was spent because of the abolition of the Court of Chancery of the County Palatine of Durham and Sadberge. They recommended that the whole act be repealed.

The whole act was repealed by section 1(1) of, and part I of schedule 1 to, the Statute Law (Repeals) Act 1976, which came into force on 27 May 1976.
