= Old Market, Bristol =

Area of Bristol, England

Old Market
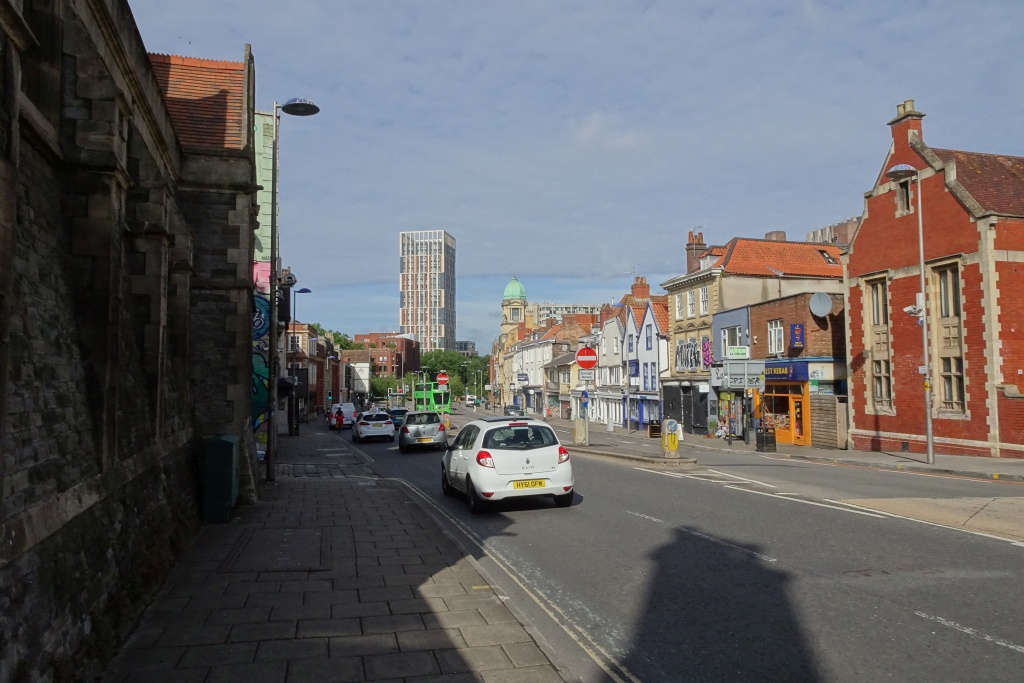
- Old Market Street, the principal thoroughfare of the area

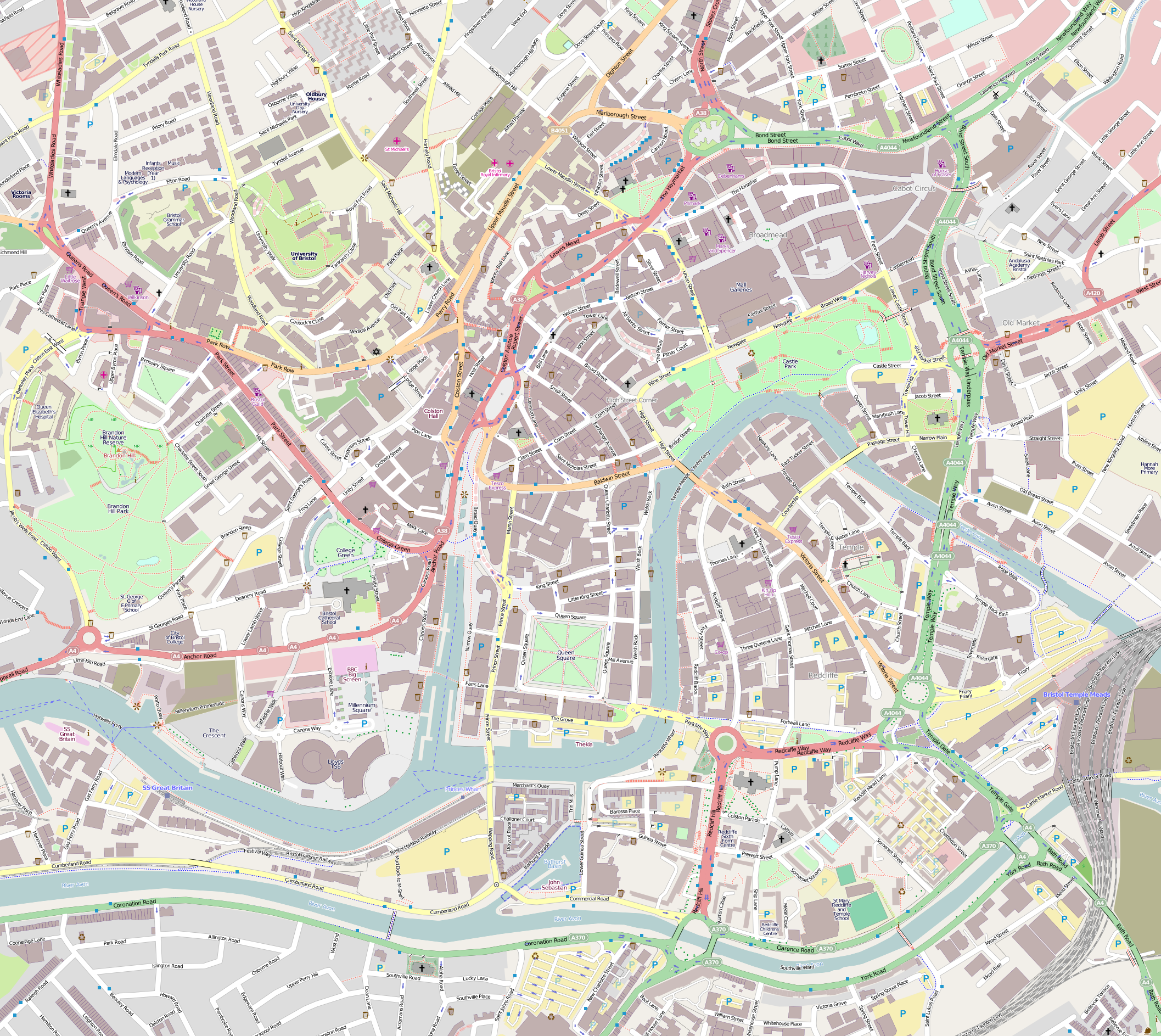
- Location in central Bristol

General information
- Location: Bristol, England
- Coordinates: 51.456°N 2.581°W
- OS grid: ST596732

Old Market is a conservation area of national significance to the east of the city centre in Bristol, England. Old Market Street and West Street form the central axis of the area, which is approximately bounded by New Street and Lawfords Gate to the north, Trinity Road and Trinity Street to the east, Unity Street and Waterloo Road to the south and Temple Way underpass to the west.

Old Market Street is an ancient market place which developed immediately outside the walls of Bristol Castle on what was for many centuries the main road to London (now the A420); on market days Jacob Street and Redcross Street, which run parallel to Old Market Street, took the through traffic. Old Market's Pie Poudre Court, which dealt out summary justice to market-day offenders, was not formally abolished until 1971.

The area contains some of Bristol's most ancient buildings, including the last two remaining houses jettied over the pavement and over sixty listed buildings. Old Market suffered decades of neglect and severe decline in the mid-20th century due to the removal of Bristol's historic central shopping area from Castle Street to Broadmead and the construction of Temple Way underpass and Easton Way, which severed it from Bristol's pre-war shopping axis in both directions. Some important buildings still suffer from neglect, but the actions of local conservationists together with grant-aided schemes in the wake of its declaration as a conservation area in 1979 have done much to arrest the decline.

Old Market has in recent years become a centre of Bristol's gay scene, and has been proclaimed as "Bristol’s Gay Village".

== History ==
There is documentary evidence of a market immediately to the east of Bristol Castle from the mid-12th century. This area of fertile land with many market gardens was referred to as "Old Market" from the 15th century.

In the 13th century, the area was enclosed by a defensive ditch, with Lawford's Gate at the eastern end separating it from West Street. The ditch marked the boundary of the town of Bristol. The area was characterised by long narrow plots of land, some of which survive today.

West Street was outside Bristol's jurisdiction and exempt from local taxes, and became a place of inns, low lodgings, squatters and outlaws. Old Market Street prospered as Bristol's trade grew, developing into a 370 metres (1,210 ft) long street connecting the east gate of the castle with Lawford's Gate, wide in its middle section and narrowing for the gates.

In the 15th and 16th century, the area grew in importance and became the site of almshouses and manufacture, as well as houses, inns and shops.

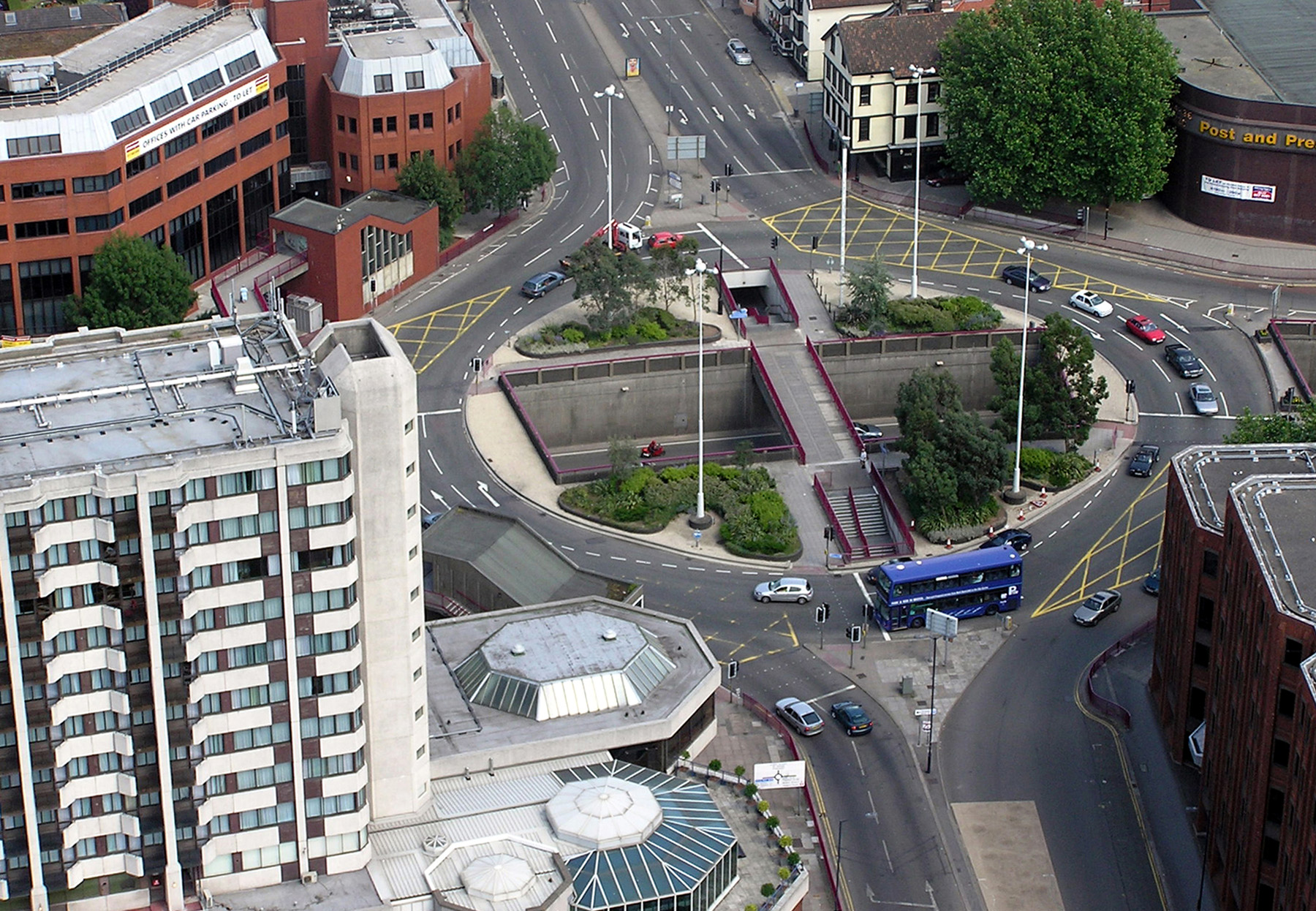
Temple Way Underpass and Old Market Roundabout, with Stag and Hounds Public House top centre

Old Market did not fare well in the English Civil War. During the Parliamentarian attack on Lawford's Gate, much of West Street may have been destroyed, and buildings to the east of Lawford's Gate may have been demolished to give the Royalists a clear defensive line of fire. Much of the area was redeveloped following the war. The castle was demolished, allowing Old Market Street and Castle Street to became a major commercial axis. Many of the buildings erected during this period survive today.

In 1768, Lawford's Gate was demolished which allowed the extension of the Castle Street – Old Market Street axis into West Street. Old Market became home to a widening range of trades. The well-off built town houses in Old Market Street and West Street, while in the side streets leading off to either side the artisans crowded in.

By the end of the 19th century, market trading was becoming increasingly difficult due to the increase in wheeled traffic. Old Market became an important tram terminus, serving areas to the east, north-west and south of the city. By now it was also a well-established shopping street, connecting seamlessly with Castle Street.

Parts of the area were affected by slum clearance programmes in the 1930s, but it was the severance caused by the destruction of Castle Street together with the building of Temple Way underpass (which obliterated the western end of Old Market Street) and a proposed road widening scheme that sent the area into near-terminal decline. Some businesses relocated to Broadmead while others closed. Large parts of the area were zoned for redevelopment, and the area was severely blighted. In the 1970s, the value of what remained started to gain recognition, and in 1979 the area was declared a conservation area. Since then many of its at-risk buildings have been restored, and a more sensitive approach to development has done much to improve the area.

== Significant buildings ==
Old Market contains over 60 listed buildings, some dating from before the 17th century. Landmark buildings include the domed Methodist Central Hall (now converted to flats), Holy Trinity Church (now a music venue and studio), St Jude's Church (now converted to residential), St Nicholas of Tolentino Church, Trinity Road Library, the Holy Trinity Almshouses (founded by John and Isabella Barstaple in 1402 and rebuilt in the mid-19th century, now residential), the Stag and Hounds pub (once home of the Pie Poudre Court), the Palace Hotel (derelict) and Gardiners Warehouse.

Other significant buildings include Kingsley Hall, a Georgian house jettied over the pavement, and 7 Redcross Street, a grand Georgian house with a shell porch. However it is often the townscape that gives Old Market its importance; for example 68-71 Old Market Street where classical Georgian facades stand next to earlier gabled timber-framed houses. Meanwhile, 65 Old Market Street is an old drill hall.

== Pie-Poudre Court ==
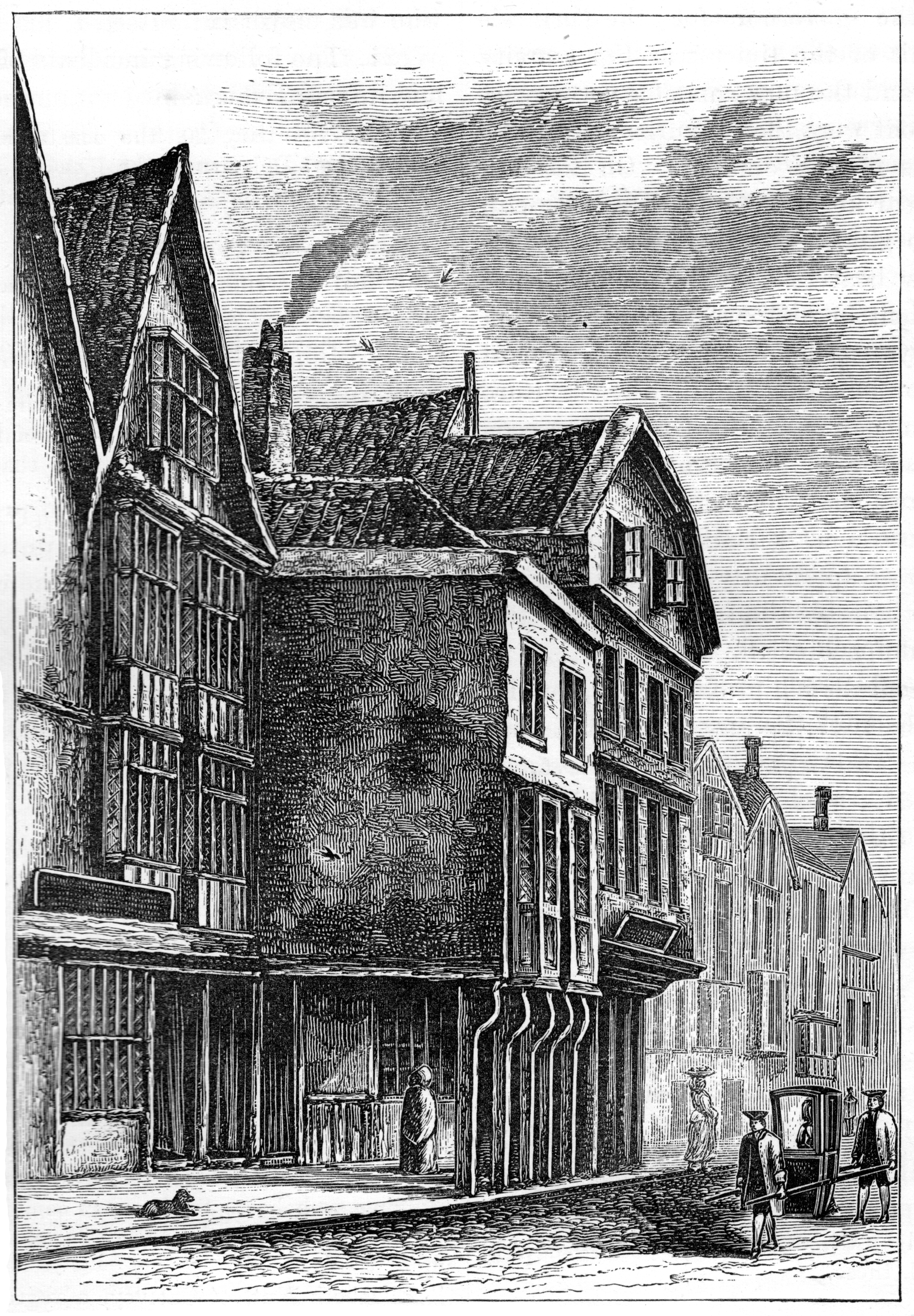
Pie-Poudre Court in the 19th century

In Norman times a court was set up to deal summarily with thieves and debtors of the market and fair called the Pie-Poudre Court (also spelt pie poudre or Piepowders). The name comes from the French, "pieds poudrés" which can be translated as "dusty feet", and was a temporary court set up for the duration of a fair or market to deal with travellers who were not resident in the town.

It was held in the open air under an ancient oak tree, the site of which the Stag and Hounds was built on. There is no actual record of when the court moved into the inn, where it was reputedly held in the first-floor room.

It is believed that this was the last "active" Court of Piepowders, being abolished by the Courts Act 1971. Although it had not actually met since the abolition of the fair in 1870, an annual proclamation was still read on the last day of September under the portico of the inn.

== Gay Village ==
Old Market has been declared Bristol's Gay Village, and most of the pubs and bars on West Street are gay-run or LGBT-gay friendly.

== Notable people ==
- Thomas Lawrence was born in Redcross Street.
- Edward William Godwin was born in Old Market Street.
- Horace Batchelor had his office in the Old Market.
- Cary Grant worked as a lime-lighter at the Empire Theatre.
- Amelia Dyer, serial killer, lived in Trinity Street around 1861.
