= The Hand and Shears =

Listed pub in Smithfield, London, England

- The pub in 2014

General information
- Type: Public house
- Location: 1 Middle Street, Smithfield, London, England
- Coordinates: 51.51928°N 0.09884°W
- Year built: c. 1850; 176 years ago
- Renovated: 1896 (remodelled); 20th century (altered)
- Owner: Trust Inns

Design and construction
- Designations

Listed Building – Grade II
- Official name: Hand and Shears public house
- Designated: 5 June 1972
- Reference no.: 1193734

Website
- thehandandshears.com

The Hand and Shears is a Grade II listed public house on Middle Street in Smithfield, London, England. Dating in origin to at least the 16th century, it is closely associated with Bartholomew Fair and takes its name from the area's historic cloth trade. Although the present building dates from around 1850, it retains an important historic interior centred on a multi-room layout around an island servery. The pub is included on the Campaign for Real Ale (CAMRA)'s National Inventory of Historic Pub Interiors, where it is recognised as being of "outstanding national historic importance".

== History ==
The Hand and Shears traces its origins to at least the 16th century and takes its name from the cloth trade centred on Smithfield. The pub was closely associated with the annual Bartholomew Fair, serving as the meeting place for traditional opening ceremonies and hosting the court of piepowders, which dealt with disputes arising during the event. According to local tradition, the fair was formally opened when the Lord Mayor of London cut a piece of cloth with a pair of shears, echoing the pub's name.

The present building was constructed around 1850, replacing an earlier structure on the site. By 1872 it had come under the ownership of Whitbread Brewery, before being acquired by Barclay Perkins in 1896. That year the interior was remodelled, with alterations including changes to the entrance arrangement, bar fittings and circulation spaces.

Further alterations were carried out during the 1920s, including improvements to the ground-floor bars and the creation of enhanced dining facilities on the first floor. The pub became known for its food trade and attracted notable visitors including prime minister Stanley Baldwin and Winston Churchill in the early 1930s.

On 5 June 1972, the Hand and Shears was designated a Grade II listed building. Following structural damage caused by nearby construction work, the pub closed for 18 months in 1982–83. Repair and refurbishment works were completed in 1989, during which historic fittings were carefully retained and reinstated.

It was included on the Campaign for Real Ale (CAMRA)'s National Inventory of Historic Pub Interiors before the inventory's grading system was revised. Under the revised scheme, it is rated three stars and its interior is regarded as being "of outstanding national historic importance". As of August 2026 the freehold was owned by Trust Inns.

== Architecture ==
=== Exterior ===
The building occupies a prominent corner site with frontages to both Middle Street and Kinghorn Street. Built of yellow London stock brick, it has three storeys above a traditional pub frontage incorporating painted timberwork and leaded windows. The upper floors are lit by multi-paned sash windows set within recessed openings, while the roof is concealed behind a parapet and is not visible from street level. The ground floor frontage is divided into bays and includes several entrances, with curved doors at the corner and decorative detailing around the bar entrances. Historic-style signage is incorporated into the leaded glazing, and a wrought-iron sign marks the former saloon bar entrance on Kinghorn Street. At the southern end of the frontage, an arched opening leads to a staircase serving the upper floor.

=== Interior ===
The central serving area in 2014

The interior is arranged around a central serving area that provides access to and overlooks four separate bar rooms. Much of the bar fitting dates from the 1896 remodelling, including a central island back-bar feature with shelving and mirrored panels. The panels include etched and frosted glazing, and surviving door glass identifies former drinking areas including the "Saloon" and "Private Bar". Parts of the bar counter may pre-date these alterations, while later additions include extra shelving introduced during a refurbishment in 1989.

Glazed partitions continue to separate the different rooms, although openings have been created between most of them. The various bars retain extensive timber panelling, much of it historic, together with brick-and-tile fireplaces dating from the 1920s in the former saloon bar and dining room. The compartmentalised arrangement around the central servery remains clearly legible despite later alterations.

On the first floor, an L-shaped dining and function room dates largely from alterations carried out in 1926–27. Historic decorative features, including skirting boards, a plaster cornice, and dado and picture rails, remain in place, although the serving area has been altered and the toilet facilities have been modernised. The function room is known as the Court of Piepowders Room, recalling the historic court associated with Bartholomew Fair that formerly met at the premises.

== See also ==
- List of pubs in London
