= Palace Hotel, Bristol =

Hotel in Bristol, England

Palace Hotel
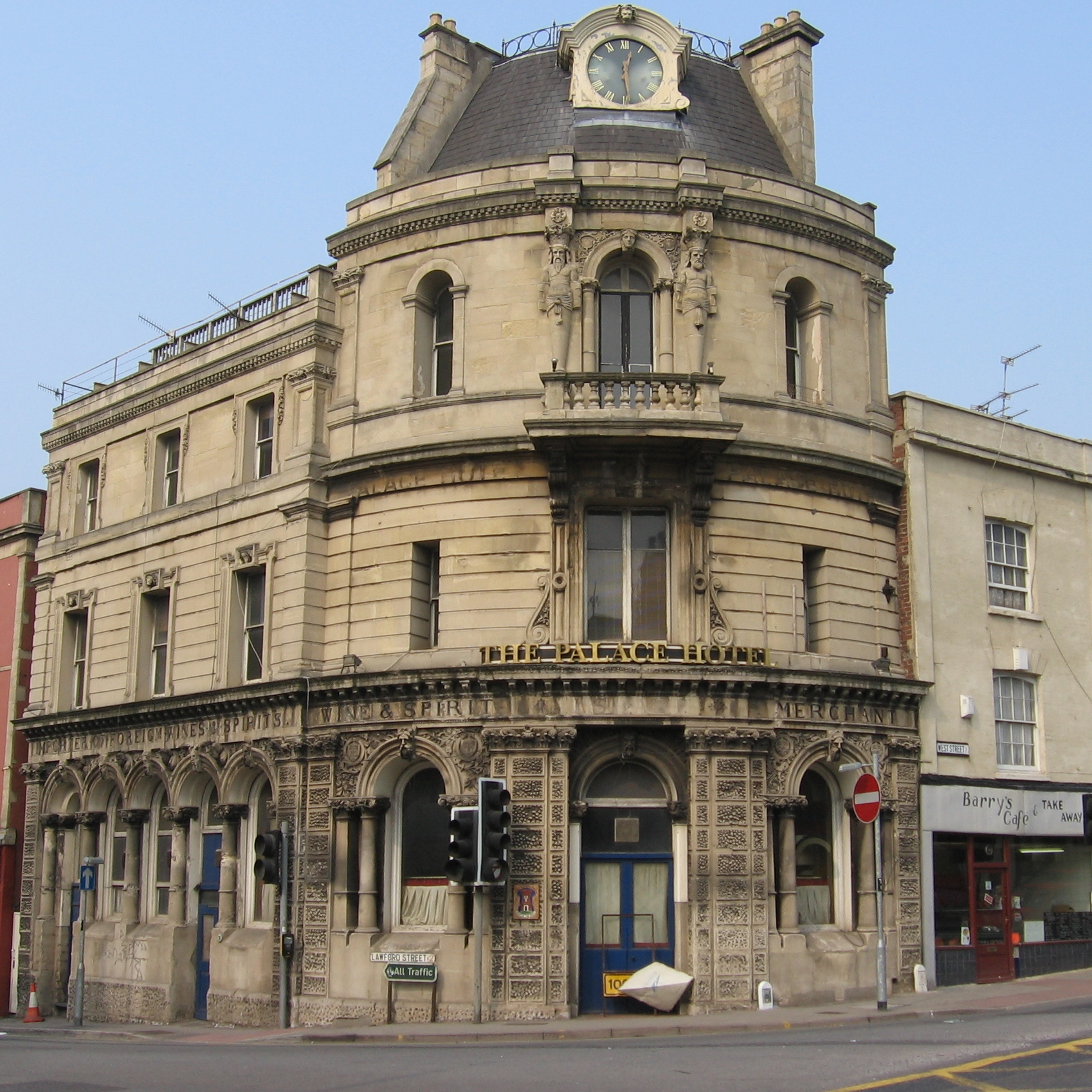

- Location within Bristol

General information
- Location: Bristol, England
- Coordinates: 51.456581°N 2.579910°W
- Completed: c 1860

The Palace Hotel (also known as "The Gin Palace") is a historic pub in Bristol, England. A grade II listed building, it is part of the Old Market Conservation area. Its exterior ornamentation includes two hermai in the Assyrian-style.

== History ==
The Palace Hotel was built in 1869 for the wine and spirits merchant John Sharp. At that time it was thought that a new Great Western Railway main station was going to be established nearby. For that reason it was to be called the 'Railway Hotel', but Isambard Kingdom Brunel's Temple Meads station was built half a mile south, so trade was less than expected. A smaller Midland Railway terminus station, Bristol St Philip's, opened nearby but was closed in 1953 and subsequently demolished.

The bar has a sloping floor. In 2000 Thomas Brooman, co-founder and managing director of World of Music, Arts and Dance took charge of the Palace. He spent much time and money bringing the place up to the high standard for which it is worthy but after five years decided it was time to move on. The Palace closed its doors in mid-2005 and was sold. The following year the new owner submitted a planning application to change its use to an estate agent's office. In August 2008, further applications were pending, with vigorous counter-moves to restore it to a pub.

In November 2008 it was announced that the owners of the Bristol Bear Bar across the road had bought the lease and, following a period of decoration in which maintenance of the pub's original features was a priority, it reopened briefly in late 2017 as a gay venue, trading as 'The Gin Palace'.

In March 2018 it closed it doors again, and has not opened since. The upper floors have continued to be used as rental accommodation.
