= Stag and Hounds, Bristol =

Pub in Bristol, England

Stag and Hounds
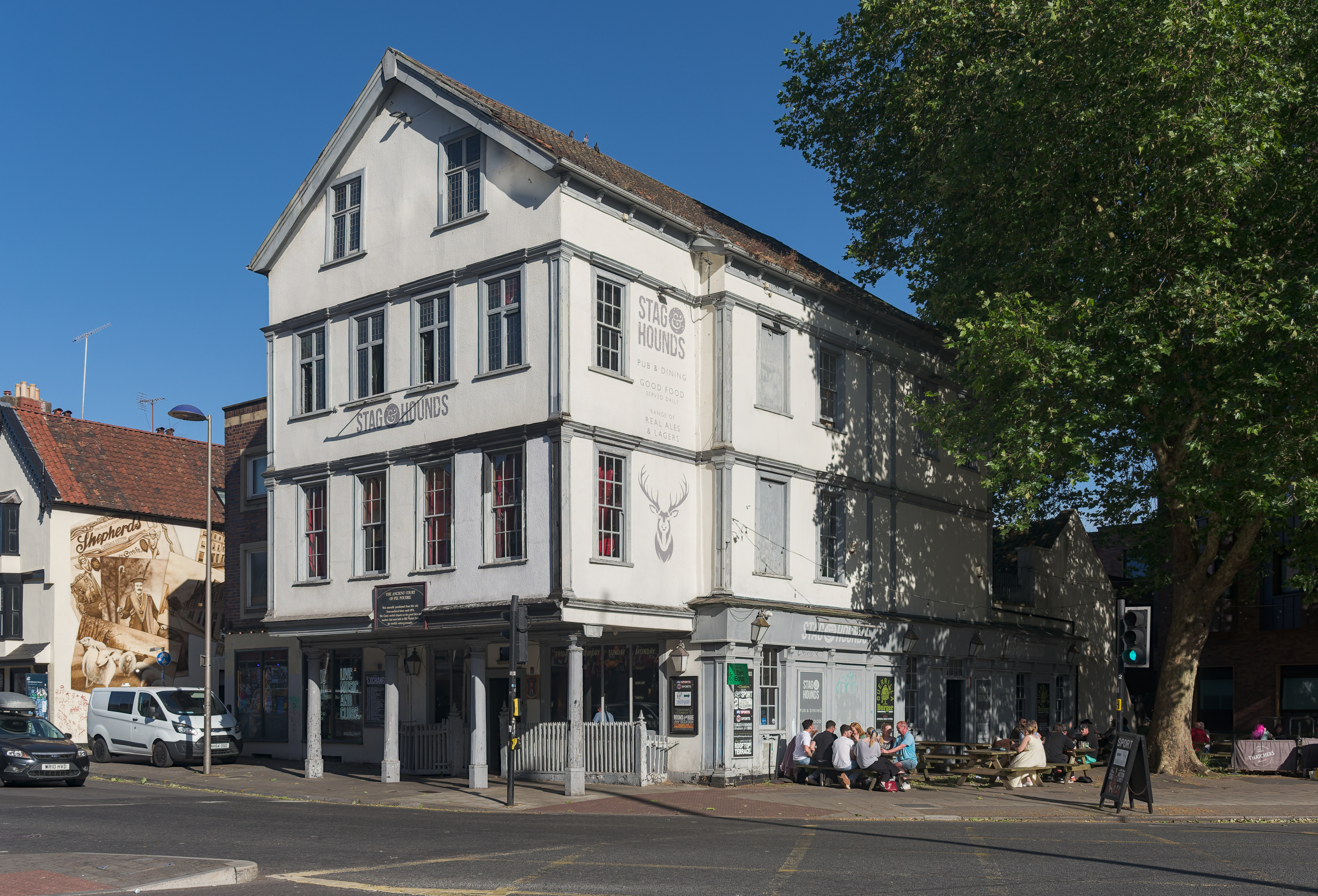

- Location within Bristol

General information
- Location: Bristol, England
- Coordinates: 51.455451°N 2.583203°W
- Construction started: 1483

Design and construction
- Designations

Listed Building – Grade II
- Designated: 8 Jan 1959
- Reference no.: 1207592

The Stag and Hounds is a grade II listed pub in Old Market, Bristol, England. The oldest parts of the building date to 1483, when it was probably as a private house. The current building is predominantly from the early 18th century, when it became a pub. It was partly rebuilt in the 1960s, and refurbished in 1987. At one time the inn was flanked by houses, but the building of a dual carriageway underpass has left it isolated.

A well in the former rear court has a 19th-century iron hand pump with flywheel and pump rods, an early example of an installation for raising water from a well. This old iron pump, operated by a wheel six feet in diameter, is in fine condition and all its parts still move. It is unique in Bristol.

There is also a minute window looking out onto the courtyard, which opens onto a small room set between floors and is only accessible through a trap-door in what is now a bathroom. It is possible that this may be a survival from the days of priest-hunting.

The modern day pub was renowned during the 2010s as a live music venue with a wide variety of bands ranging across many genres, although this has lessened after a change in direction after a refurbishment in 2019.

== Pie-Poudre Court ==
In Norman times a court was set up to deal summarily with thieves and debtors of a market called the Pie-Poudre Court (also spelt pie poudre or Piepowders). The name comes from the French, "pieds poudrés" which can be translated as "dusty feet", and was a temporary court set up for the duration of a fair or market to deal with travelers who were not resident in the town.

It was held in the open air under an ancient oak tree, the site of which the Stag and Hounds was built upon. There is no actual record of when the court moved into the inn, which was reputedly held in the first-floor room.

It is believed that this was the last "active" Court of Piepowders, being abolished by the Courts Act 1971. Although it had not actually met since the abolition of the fair in 1870, an annual proclamation was still read on the last day of September under the portico of the inn.
