= Old Market Street drill hall =

Military building in Bristol, England

- Bristol
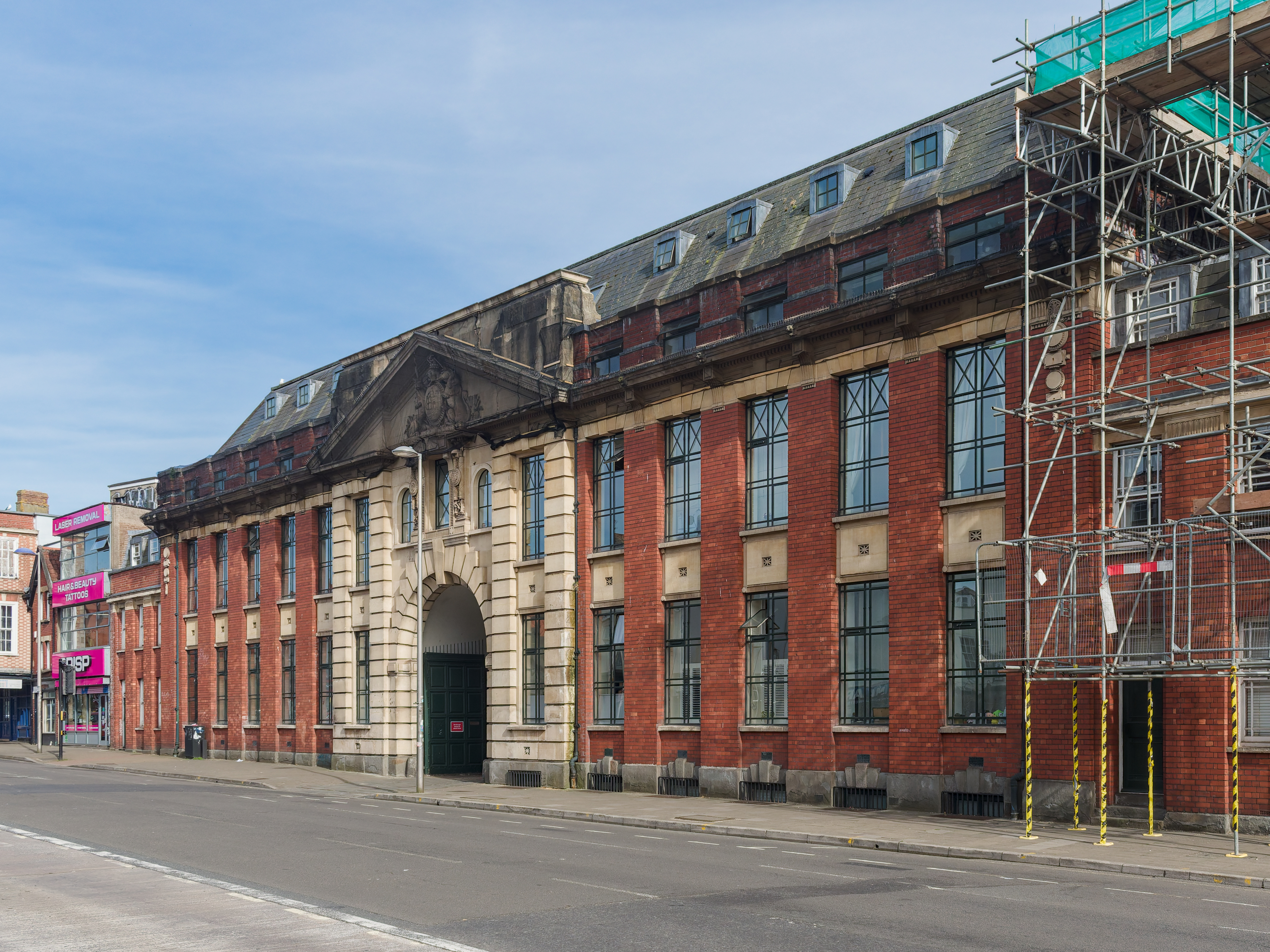
- Old Market Street drill hall

Site information
- Type: Drill hall

Location
- Location in Bristol
- Coordinates: 51.45584°N 2.58190°W

Site history
- Built: 1915
- Built for: War Office
- In use: 1915–1945

The Old Market Street drill hall is a former military installation in the Old Market district of Bristol.

== History ==
The building, which is located on the site of a former sugar warehouse and refinery, was financed by George and Henry Wills as part of arrangements to provide alternative accommodation for organisations displaced by the construction of the Wills Memorial Building. The new drill hall was designed as the headquarters of the 4th (City of Bristol) Battalion, The Gloucestershire Regiment, who had relocated from the Queen's Road drill hall in Clifton (since demolished), in June 1915.

The 4th battalion was converted into a searchlight battalion in 1938 and transferred to the Royal Artillery (as 66th (Gloucesters) Searchlight Regiment, Royal Artillery) in 1940. It was headquartered at Badminton School, Westbury-on-Trym, for much of World War II and the drill hall was used instead to accommodate US Army troops. These troops created some adverse publicity for themselves when they became involved in a serious brawl in the street outside the drill hall in July 1944. After the war the drill hall was decommissioned and fell into disrepair; it has since been converted for residential use.
