= Thomas Brooman =

British music promoter

Thomas Brooman CBE
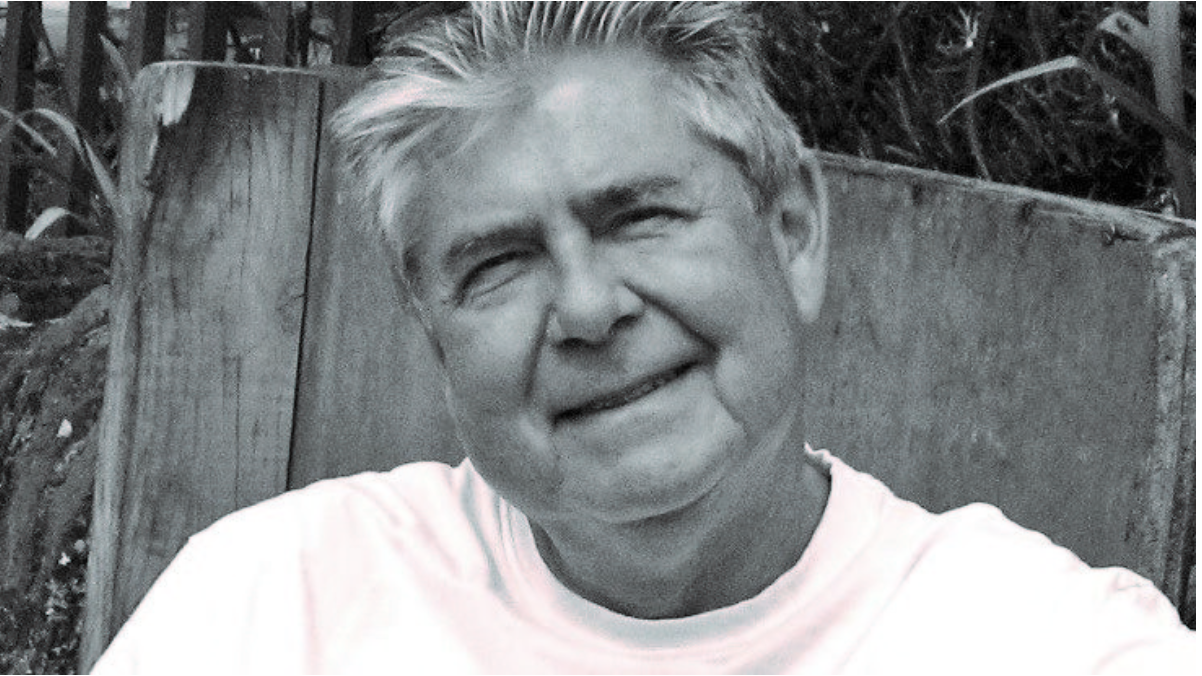
- Born: 1 April 1954 (age 72); Bristol, United Kingdom
- Education: Oxford University, United Kingdom
- Known for: Co-founder and Artistic Director of the WOMAD (World of Music Arts and Dance) Festival
- Spouse(s): Amanda Budd, (m. 2004)

Thomas Brooman is an English festival organiser. He is best known as the co-founder and artistic director of the WOMAD (World of Music Arts and Dance) Festival.

== Early life ==
Born in Bristol in 1954, Brooman attended Bristol Grammar School and spent time during his childhood in Buenos Aires, Argentina. He attended Oxford University, reading English Language and Literature at Exeter College under the tutorship of Jonathan Wordsworth, graduating in 1976. The second child in an academic family, his father Frederick S. Brooman was an author and economics lecturer at the University of Bristol, subsequently Professor of Economics at the Open University.

Returning to Bristol after graduation from Oxford, Brooman took a path in music, firstly as a drummer during the heyday of punk music in the late 1970s with several bands in Bristol, including the Media, the Spics and the Tesco Chainstore Massacre. In 1980, with a group of friends, he established a record magazine publication called The Bristol Recorder, and through this project, he made contact with the singer-songwriter Peter Gabriel, with whom the concept of WOMAD was born.

== WOMAD Festival ==
As the name World of Music Arts and Dance suggests, the WOMAD Festival presents a wide range of top international groups and artists alongside domestically popular and open artists whose music draws upon influences of cultures other than their own, with Asha Bhosle on the same line-up as the Pogues, Alpha Blondy followed by Aswad, or Thomas Mapfumo together with the Proclaimers.

Work began on the first festival in early 1981, with Peter Gabriel as the guiding inspiration for the open minded values which have characterised the event ever since. Brooman also played a central role from the start, along with a group of colleagues, including Martin Elbourne, chef Jonathan Arthur, Stephen Pritchard and Bob Hooton. The first WOMAD Festival was held in 1982. Despite huge financial difficulties, the festival prospered and grew, and over the following 26 years Brooman continued as WOMAD's Festival and Artistic Director, leading to the establishment of WOMAD as an organisation and its affiliated charity, the WOMAD Foundation.

Over these years WOMAD Festivals helped to establish a wider audience for many international artists and contributed to the identification of world music as a description of music from a global context.

As artistic director of WOMAD until 2008, Brooman led the festival to many locations all over the world - collaborating in the production of more than one hundred events in total; in Africa, Asia, Australasia, Europe and North America.

== Other activities ==
In 1987 Brooman also co-founded Real World Records, a label conceived as a creative partnership between Peter Gabriel and the WOMAD organisation. WOMAD had become well-known for nurturing musical collaboration between artists at the festival and Real World Records developed with the same spirit of adventure and artistic innovation. The label is distributed by Virgin Records and over the years has released more than two hundred titles, including a collaboration between Nusrat Fateh Ali Khan and Massive Attack.

In 2000, Brooman also ventured into the world of pub ownership by purchasing Bristol's historic Palace Hotel in Old Market. Built in 1869, The Palace is a landmark Bristol City centre building and is famous for its sloping bar floor and elaborate Victorian columns and ornamentation. At the time of its purchase in 2000, the whole building was in need of total refurbishment and Brooman undertook the project with the help of a small but dedicated team. The Palace opened its doors to the public again in October 2000.

Since leaving WOMAD in 2008 Brooman has worked as a music advisor at Dartington Hall and Creative Youth Network in Bristol and as a music mentor at South West Music School. Brooman also worked as Music Programmer at Salisbury Arts Centre.

Brooman has worked on collaborative and creative projects with many artists from all over the world, including Bill Cobham and Asere, Madosini and Patrick Duff, David D'Or, Totó La Momposina, Nusrat Fateh Ali Khan, Terem Quartet and Trilok Gurtu. He has also been extensively involved in record compilation and production work.

Brooman wrote a memoir of his life and times entitled My Festival Romance, published by Tangent Books in 2017.

== Awards and honours ==
Described by The Times as a "visionary artistic director", Brooman was also recognised in 2005 by the BBC (British Broadcasting Corporation) as the recipient of the first World Shaker Award in the BBC Radio 3 Awards for World Music.

In 2008 he received a CBE (Commander of the Order of the British Empire) in the Queen's Birthday Honours List for his life services to music and charity.
