= City of Bristol Rifles =

1st (City of Bristol) Gloucestershire RVC 4th (City of Bristol) Battalion, Gloucestershire Regiment 66th (Gloucesters) Searchlight Regiment, RA 601 (City of Bristol) HAA Regiment, RA
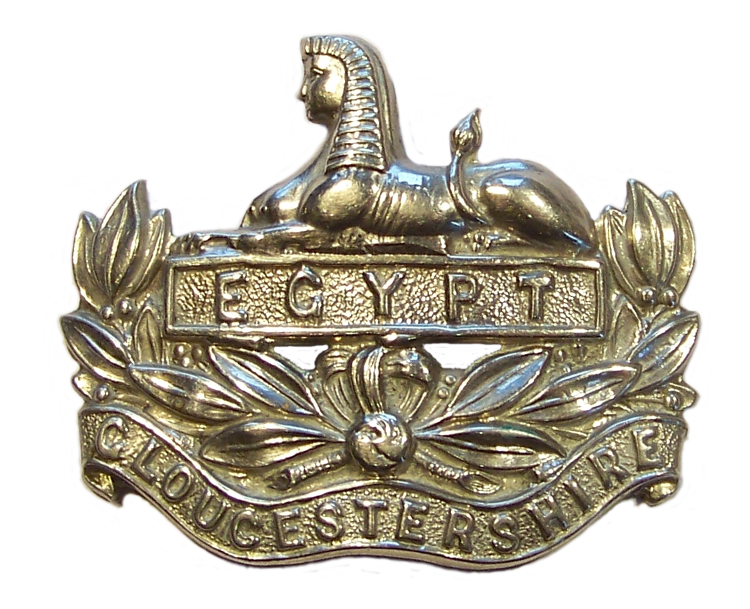
- Cap badge of the Gloucestershire Regiment
- Active: 13 September 1859 – 10 March 1955
- Country: United Kingdom
- Branch: Volunteer Force/Territorial Army
- Role: Infantry; Searchlights; Anti-aircraft artillery
- Size: 1–3 Battalions
- Part of: 48th (South Midland) Division; Anti-Aircraft Command
- Garrison/HQ: Clifton, Bristol; Old Market Street drill hall, Bristol
- Mottos: In Danger, Ready
- Engagements: World War I: Battle of the Somme; Battle of Fromelles; Third Battle of Ypres; Battle of Cambrai; Italian Front; World War II: Battle of Britain; The Blitz; Baby Blitz; Operation Diver

Commanders
- Colonel of the Regiment: Lord Mayor of Bristol

Insignia
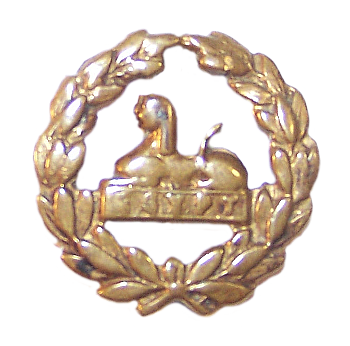
- The Glosters' Back badge

The City of Bristol Rifles was a Volunteer unit of the British Army from 1859 to 1955. It became a battalion of the Gloucestershire Regiment and fought in France, Flanders and Italy in World War I. As a searchlight unit in World War II it defended the West Country against air raids before moving to the East Coast late in the war. It continued in the postwar Territorial Army (TA) as a heavy anti-aircraft artillery regiment until amalgamated with other Gloucestershire units in 1955.

== Precursor units ==
The City of Bristol was one of several English localities that organised an 'armed association' of volunteers for home defence during the Jacobite Rising of 1745, supplementing the professionals of the Regular Army and the embodied Militia. The French Revolutionary War saw the passing of the Volunteer Act, 1794, which encouraged the enlistment of part-time local Volunteer corps under the authority of the county Lords-lieutenant. A large number of these were formed in Gloucestershire, including the Bristol Volunteer Infantry, officially formed on 23 March 1797 and commanded by Lieutenant-Colonel Evan Baillie, a Bristol merchant who had served as a junior officer in the West Indies during the Seven Years' War. The unit had begun to form on 17 February 1797, but even before being officially accepted its first duty was to guard the French prisoners of war confined at Stapleton Prison after the Militia regiments stationed in the city were sent to deal with the French landing in Pembrokeshire on 22 February 1797 (the Battle of Fishguard). By January 1798 the unit was of battalion strength, with 1000 men enrolled, and an adjutant and permanent staff of Sergeants and drummers. Volunteer units could be called out 'in aid of the civil power': the Bristol Volunteers were on duty during the Bristol food riots of April 1801. Service in the Volunteers conferred immunity from conscription into the Militia. Volunteers also received pay while on service: a national shortage of bronze coinage meant that the Bristol Volunteers, like some other units, minted their own tokens.

The Volunteers were disbanded at the Peace of Amiens in 1802, but when the peace broke down the following year and there was a renewed threat of invasion, units were rapidly formed or reformed. The Bristol unit reformed on 25 October 1803 as the Royal Bristol Volunteers (though no authorisation can be found for the assumption of the 'Royal' title, which it shared with the Royal Bristol Artillery Volunteers). It was once again commanded by Lt-Col Baillie (now MP for Bristol), and had the Mayor of Bristol as its Honorary Colonel. With muskets in short supply, Lt-Col Baillie improvised by buying up all the mop-sticks in the city and having iron spikes mounted on them. The keen Bristol volunteers adopted the motto, 'In Danger, Ready'.

The affluent Bristol suburb of Clifton had its own corps, the Clifton Volunteer Infantry, which merged with that at Westbury-on-Trym in March 1804 to form the Loyal United Westbury and Clifton Volunteer Infantry under the command of Lt-Col T. Coke, formerly of the Honourable East India Company's 15th Madras Native Infantry. Clifton was also the headquarters (HQ) of the Somerset Riflemen, raised and maintained at his own expense by Captain Sir John Jervis White Jervis, 1st Baronet, who lived in the area.

== Rifle Volunteers ==
The old Volunteers were disbanded at the end of the Napoleonic Wars, but popular enthusiasm for the Volunteer movement following a new invasion scare in 1859 saw the creation of many new Rifle Volunteer Corps (RVCs). One such unit was the City of Bristol Rifles formed under the command of Lt-Col Robert Bush, formerly a Major in the 96th Regiment of Foot, who was commissioned on 13 September 1859. By June 1860 the 1st Gloucestershire RVC comprised 10 companies. It was permitted to include 'City of Bristol' as part of its official title, with the Mayor of Bristol as its Honorary Colonel, and it adopted the motto of the old Royal Bristol Volunteers, 'In Danger, Ready'. Bush was succeeded as commanding officer (CO) on 23 January 1866 by Brevet Colonel Philpotts Wright Taylor, formerly of the Royal Canadian Rifle Regiment, who held the position until the 1880s.

Under the 'Localisation of the Forces' scheme introduced by the Cardwell Reforms of 1872, Volunteers were grouped into county brigades with their local Regular and Militia battalions – Brigade No 37 (Gloucestershire) in Western District for the Bristol Battalion. The Childers Reforms of 1881 took Cardwell's reforms further, and the Volunteers were formally affiliated to their local Regular regiment, in Bristol's case the Gloucestershire Regiment ('Glosters'), and on 1 May 1883 the battalion changed its title to 1st (City of Bristol) Volunteer Battalion, Gloucestershire Regiment. When a comprehensive mobilisation scheme for the Volunteers was established after the Stanhope Memorandum of December 1888, the 1st VB of the Gloucesters was assigned to the Severn Brigade, charged with defending the ports of the Severn Estuary, changing to the Gloucester and Somerset Brigade in 1901–2. The Volunteer Infantry Brigades were reorganised in 1906–07, when all the Gloucester Regiment VBs were assigned for training to the Portland Brigade, defending the Royal Navy's base at Portland Harbour.

A detachment of volunteers from the battalion served with the Regular 2nd Bn in the Second Boer War, winning the unit its first Battle honour: South Africa 1900–1902. The Bristol Grammar School Cadet Corps was affiliated to the battalion in 1900 and an eleventh company was authorised in 1902.

== Territorial Force ==
When the Volunteers were subsumed into the Territorial Force under the Haldane Reforms of 1908, the battalion became the 4th (City of Bristol) Battalion, Gloucestershire Regiment. It formed part of the Gloucester and Worcester Brigade in the TF's South Midland Division. Battalion HQ was at Queen's Road, Clifton, next to Bristol Museum, together with all the companies except F Company, which had a drill station in the parish of St George's Bristol.

== World War I ==
=== Mobilisation ===
On the outbreak of war in August 1914 the units of the South Midland Division had just set out for annual training when orders recalled them to their home depots for mobilisation. The Gloucester & Worcester Brigade travelled to Minehead on 2 August, but in view of the international situation the 4th Gloucesters returned to Bristol next day and the men were dismissed to their homes to await orders for mobilisation, which were issued on 4 August. The South Midland Division began concentrating at Swindon in Wiltshire, shortly afterwards moving to Essex as part of Central Force. 4th Gloucesters sent two companies to guard the petrol depots at Avonmouth Docks until the end of the month, while remainder were billeted in villages outside Chelmsford.

On the outbreak of war, TF units were invited to volunteer for Overseas Service. On 15 August 1914, the War Office issued instructions to separate those men who had signed up for Home Service only, and form them into reserve units. On 31 August, the formation of a reserve or 2nd Line unit was authorised for each 1st Line unit where 60 per cent or more of the men had volunteered for Overseas Service. The titles of these 2nd Line units would be the same as the original, but distinguished by a '2/' prefix. In this way duplicate battalions, brigades and divisions were created from the recruits who were flooding in. Later they were mobilised for overseas service in their own right and a 3rd Line created.

=== 1/4th (City of Bristol) Battalion ===
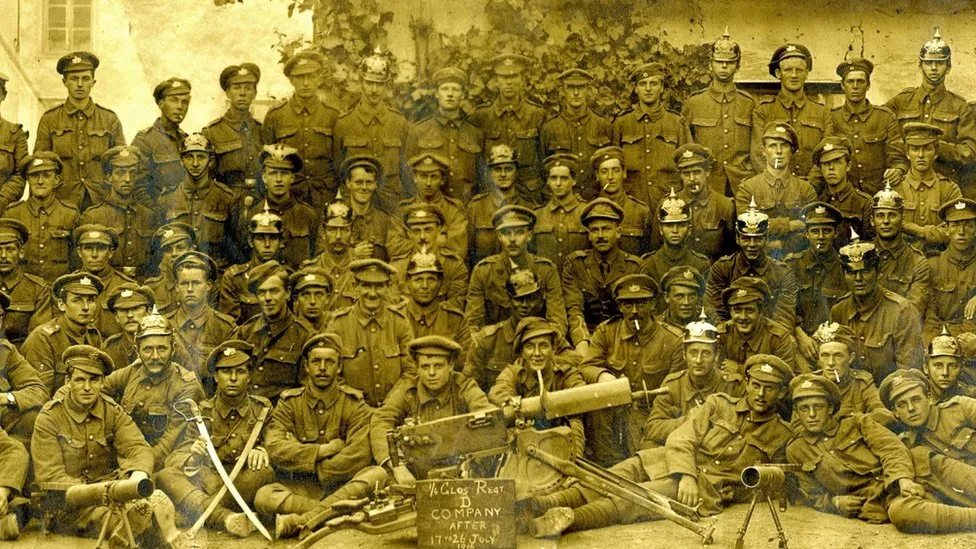
Soldiers of D Company, 1/4th Battalion, The Gloucestershire Regiment, with a captured German Maxim machine gun, and some wearing German helmets. A board in the foreground is dated "After 17-26 July 1916".

The South Midland Division underwent progressive training in Essex, and on 13 March 1915 received orders to embark to join the British Expeditionary Force (BEF) in France. The Gloucester and Worcester Brigade crossed from Folkestone to Boulogne, and by 3 April the whole division had concentrated near Cassel. After final training the battalion went into the line near Ploegsteert ('Plugstreet'). On 12 May 1915 the division was designated 48th (South Midland) Division and the brigade became 144th (Gloucester and Worcester) Brigade.

==== Somme ====
The battalion served in the trenches for 16 months before it participated in its first major battle, during the Somme offensive. On the First day on the Somme (1 July) the battalion was in bivouacs south of Sailly-le-Sec and did not participate in the division's actions, though it marched up to Mailly-Maillet in reserve. The division later took over the line west of Serre-lès-Puisieux, and 1/4th relieved 1/6th Bn in the front line on the evening of 8/9 July the trenches still in a bad state after the fighting on 1 July. The battalion was relieved on 12 July and bivouacked at Bouzincourt.

Map of the Glosters' actions at Ovillers.

On the night of 15 July 1/4th Gloucesters went back into the line in front of Ovillers-la-Boisselle and at 16.00 on 16 July was ordered to attack the German lines as part of the Battle of Bazentin Ridge – the battalion's first major attack of the war. The area to be attacked was invisible to the leading companies and to the artillery observers, so it was not until reconnaissance of the German barbed wire had been carried out that Zero hour was set. Meanwhile, the companies assembled at 22.00 for a night attack. D Company formed up in an assembly trench 150 yards (140 m) in front of the British line and B Company gathered in the communication trench leading to it. At 23.30 the patrol returned, reporting that the German line was strongly held but the wire was very much cut up. Zero was set for 02.00 on 17 July, preceded by a short (10 minute) bombardment. The attack went well and the German positions were captured, but the attackers could not make contact with 7th Bn Worcestershire Regiment on the right. By daybreak the two companies were being attacked from both flanks, but C Company was ordered to 'bomb' its way along the German frontline trench to fill the gap to 7th Worcesters. When bombs began to run short, the Gloucesters used captured German ones. 1/4th Gloucesters had consolidated the captured trenches by midday. The three attacking companies had each lost about 80 men, but after fighting off violent counter-attacks the battalion went 'over the top' again at 17.00 on 18 July, A Company advancing up the old German front trenches and C Company advancing in parallel up the old German second line. By 20.00 they had successfully captured the northern end of Ovillers. A further attack was ordered for 01.30 on 19 July, but the advance was held up by machine gun fire and the Germans having set alight their abandoned dugouts. In three days' fighting the battalion lost 275 all ranks.

The battalion attacked again at Pozières on 23 July. The 1/6th Gloucesters were 'literally mown down' (Official History) and only a few bombers got into the enemy trench. The 1/4th tried to help by bombing its way down the trench from the left, but when the 1/6th was overwhelmed the 1/4th was ordered to halt. The battalion drove off a German counter-attack next day with the help of artillery and trench mortars. The division was then withdrawn for rest.

The division was back in action on Pozières Ridge on the night of 14–15 August, fighting unsuccessfully to capture and hold 'Skyline Trench' at a cost of 70 casualties. However, it made a successful attack on the Leipzig Redoubt on 21 August, taking 150 prisoners and resisting three counter-attacks. On 3 September 1/4th Gloucesters' line was heavily bombarded while a neighbouring division attacked, but casualties were slight.

The battalion spent the first part of the winter on the Ancre Heights, and then spent the whole of January 1917 out of the line in training. On 2 February 1/4th Bn relieved French troops south of the River Somme.

==== Hindenburg Line ====
1/4th Gloucesters was next engaged in following the German retreat to the Hindenburg Line (Operation Alberich) in the spring of 1917. The German movement began on 16 March and next day 1/4th Gloucesters sent out a patrol that pushed forward to the banks of the Somme opposite La Chapelette without meeting the enemy. 48th Divisional Engineers bridged the river and three days later the battalion crossed; by 29 March it had reached Villers-Faucon. Next day two companies made a converging attack on St Emilie at 16.00 without their planned artillery support. The German rearguard fought hard for the village, which was captured at a cost to the battalion of 58 casualties, of whom seven died. The battalion then 'stood to' on 1 April while the rest of 144th Bde attacked Épehy. The pursuit ended on 5 April as the leading units reached the Hindenburg Line, when 1/4th Bn was in Cartigny.

There were still some actions against outposts of the Hindenburg Line. On the night of 12/13 April B and C Companies of 1/4th Bn attacked Queuchettes Wood. They had achieved all their objectives by 04.00, and B Company drove off a counter-attack. The battalion was then heavily shelled but casualties were light. In the evening it was relieved and went back to billets at Hamel. However, it was less successful at The Knoll on 24 April. 1/6th Gloucesters attacked and failed to take it, so the rest of the brigade was ordered to renew the attack at 23.00. Major L.G. Parkinson, the acting CO of 1/4th Bn, was killed just before Zero while receiving his orders by telephone, and although one company reached its objective, two others pushed too far forwards and were forced to withdraw to avoid being surrounded.

==== Ypres ====
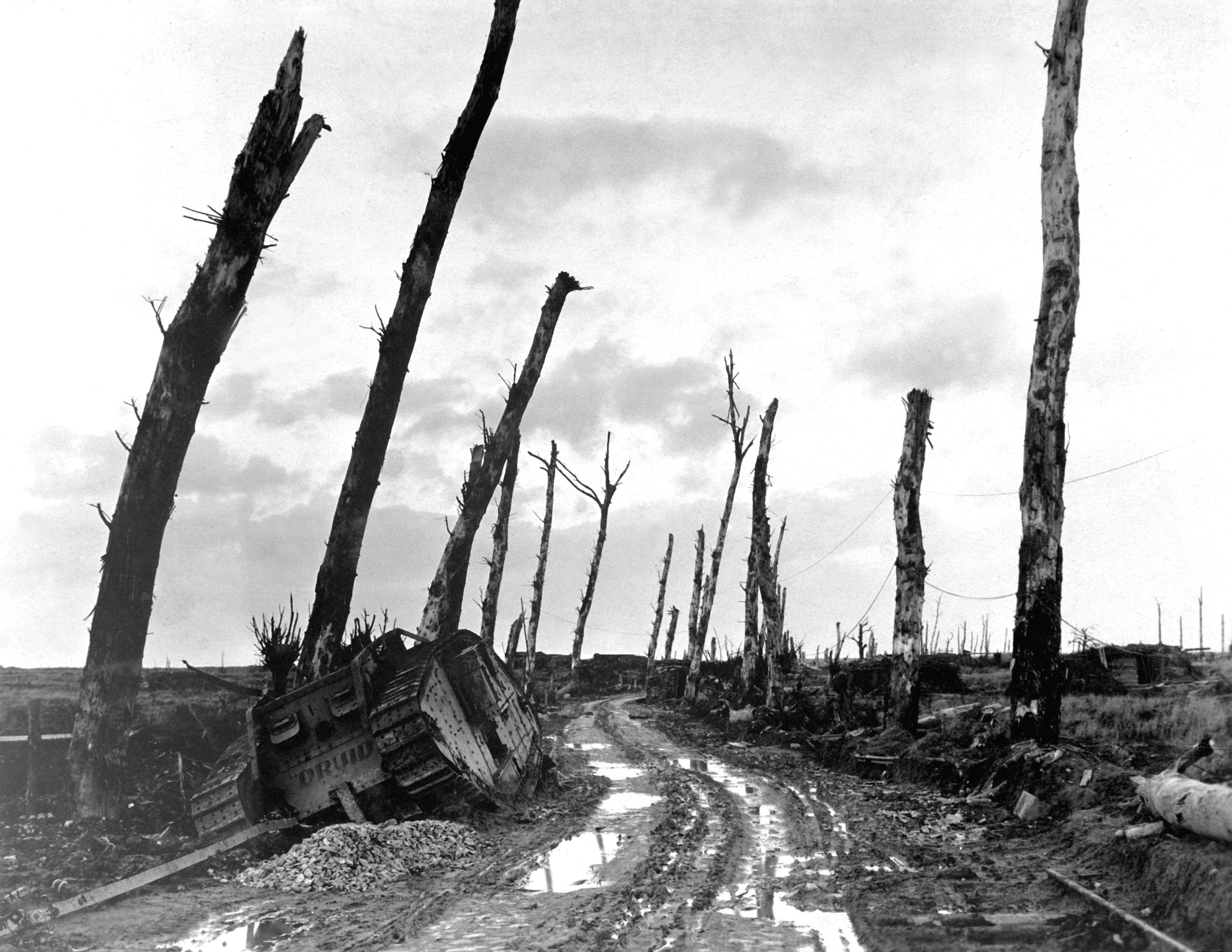
The battlefield of Polecappelle.

The division moved to the Ypres Salient in July. During the Third Ypres Offensive the 1/4th Battalion was not engaged at the Battle of Langemarck on 16 August, when 145th Bde attacked with heavy casualties, nor in 48th (SM) Division's other attacks on 19, 22 or 27 August. It then spent the next month out of the line at training camps. Only part of the division was engaged in the Polygon Wood (28 September–3 October), and at the Broodseinde on 4 October, 1/4th Bn's participation was limited to two platoons as stretcher-bearers and guards for prisoners.

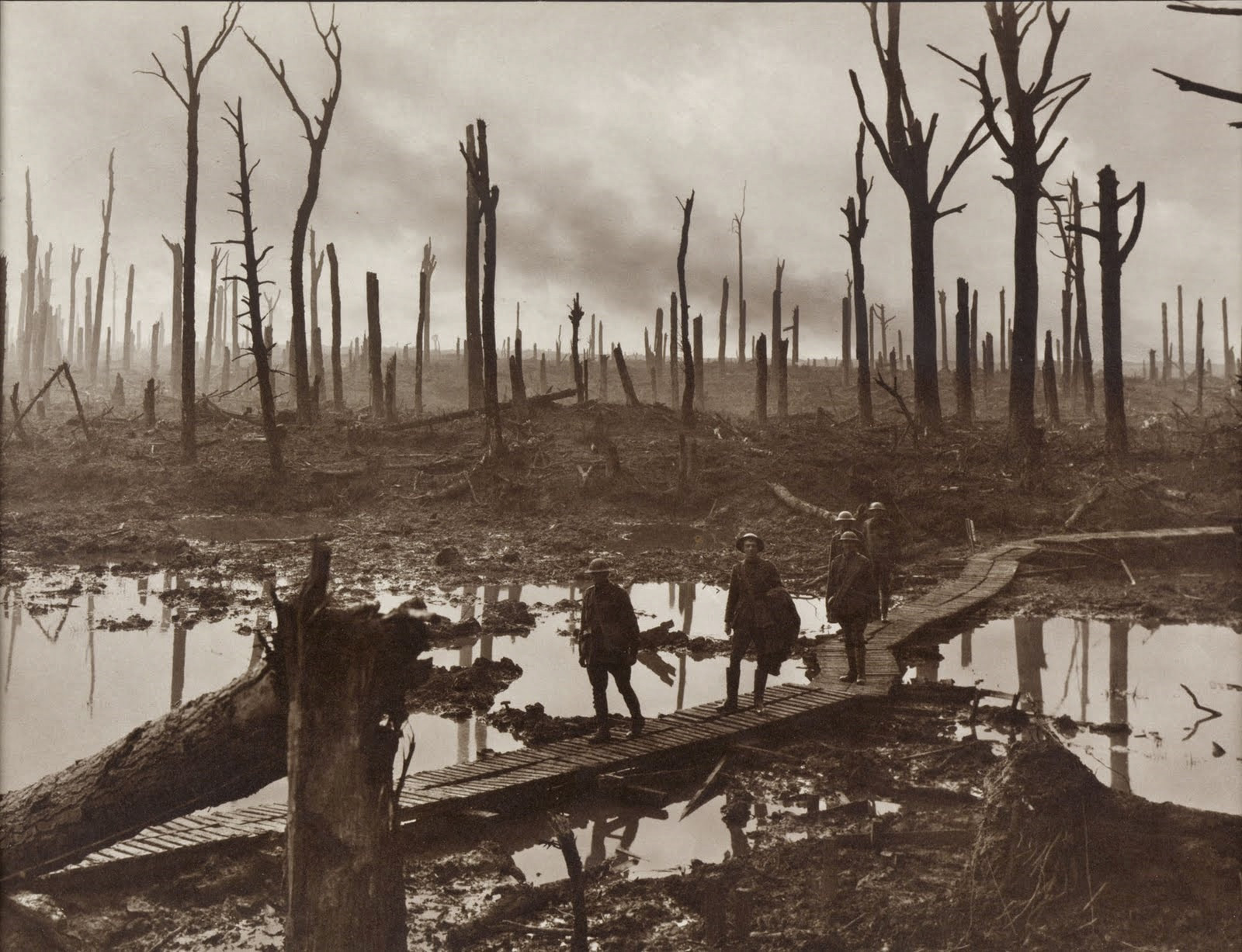
A duckboard track in the Ypres Salient, October 1917.

However, the battalion attacked at the Battle of Poelcappelle on 9 October, when 144th Bde advanced up the Poelcapelle Spur towards Westroosbeke with 1/4th Bn on the left, A and D Companies leading. The battalion arrived by motor bus and was supposed to be guided to the start line, but when no guides appeared the CO, Lt-Col John Crosskey, led them himself, losing three companies and a platoon on the way up the duckboard tracks in the dark. It was not until 04.30 that the battalion was assembled at 'Tweed House'. When the attack began at 05.25 the leading companies were able to get within 50 yards (46 m) of the Creeping barrage, but after its first lift the men moving over the sodden ground could not achieve the assumed rate of advance and the barrage fell further and further in front. The brigade was 'raked by machine-gun fire at the outset' from German positions that were too close to be covered by the barrage, and the battalion got held up about 150 yards (140 m) east of 'County Crossroads', though a couple of small parties pushed forwards among the ruins of 'Oxford Houses' where they replied to the German sniper fire. These parties eventually had to fall back because of a divisional barrage put down to help 8th Worcesters in another failed attack on Oxford Houses. The battalion had suffered 177 casualties, of whom 69 died. Lieutenant-Colonel Crosskey was seriously wounded and evacuated to England, but not before he had provided a detailed report, in which he blamed the exhaustion of the men after the long approach march, the mud, and the pace of the barrage. He was awarded the Military Cross (MC).

==== Italy ====
On 10 November 1917 the 48th (SM) Division received orders to move to Italy. By 1 December the units had finished detraining around Legnago on the Adige. On 1 March 1918 the division relieved 7th Division in the front line of the Montello sector on the Piave Front, and held the line until 16 March, with 1/4th Bn in reserve. On 1 April it moved westward into reserve for the middle sector of the Asiago Plateau Front.

On 15 June the Austro-Hungarian Army made what proved to be its last attack, known to the British participants as the Battle of Asiago. The 48th (SM) Division had been particularly hard-hit by the Spanish flu epidemic, and the average strength of the 1/4th Gloucesters' four companies was only 70 men instead of the establishment of 250. The battalion was at the foot of the mountain in reserve, and although it was brought up to the line by lorry it took no part in the counter-attack that regained 48th (SM) Division's positions.

The 1/4th Gloucesters carried out a raid on the night of 23/24 October as a diversion from the Allied offensive to be launched next morning (the Battle of Vittorio Veneto). The battalion attacked the village of Ave and took prisoner six officers and 223 other ranks for the loss of four men wounded. Defeated on the Piave, the Austrians abandoned their positions on the Asiago Plateau on 29/30 October, and the 48th (SM) Division began a pursuit. 1/4th Gloucesters attacked the Austrian Winterstellung (Winter position) on the morning of 1 November but were driven back. A flank attack the following morning shifted the Austrian defenders, and the pursuit continued down the gorge of the Val d'Assa.

On 3 November 1918, at Osteria del Termine, the division surrounded and captured a large force of Austrian troops including the corps commander and three divisional commanders. 1/4th Gloucesters guarded the prisoners, allowing the division to push on. By 15.00 on 4 November, when the Armistice with Austria came into force, the division had pushed forward into the Trentino and 1/4th Gloucesters was at Baselga di Piné. After the conclusion of hostilities the division was withdrawn to Italy for the winter. Demobilisation began in January 1919 gathered pace in February. On 11 March the last cadre of the battalion, 7 officers and 43 other ranks, left for England.

During the war 48 officers and 333 other ranks of the battalion had died on active service.

=== 2/4th (City of Bristol) Battalion ===
The 2nd Line battalion was raised on 6 September 1914 and took its place in 2/1st Gloucester and Worcester Brigade in 2nd South Midland Division. The Gloucesters created their 2nd Line by dividing their existing TF battalions in two, rather than creating new ones from scratch. Therefore, although the 2/4th Bn received a higher proportion of recruits it began with the experience of two companies of prewar TF men so it made rapid progress. At first the men lived at home, and little or nothing was available in terms of uniforms, arms or equipment. It was not until the division concentrated at Northampton in January 1915 that the men were issued with .256-in Japanese Ariska rifles with which to train. Here they formed part of First Army of Central Force, but when the 1st South Midland Division went to France, the 2nd took its place at Chelmsford and became part of Third Army of Central Force, with a definite role in Home Defence. The battalions formed their machine gun sections while at Chelmsford, but the strength of the battalions fluctuated widely as they were drawn upon for drafts for their 1st Line battalions. In August 1915 the division was numbered as the 61st (2nd South Midland) Division and the brigade became the 183rd (2nd Gloucester and Worcester) Brigade.

In February and March 1916 the units of 61st (2nd SM) Division moved to Salisbury Plain to begin final training for overseas service. Here they were issued with .303 SMLE rifles in place of the Japanese weapons, and four Lewis guns per battalion in place of dummy guns and antique Maxim guns. Final leave was granted in April and May and entrainment for the embarkation ports began on 21 May. By 28 May the division was concentrating in France.

==== Fromelles ====
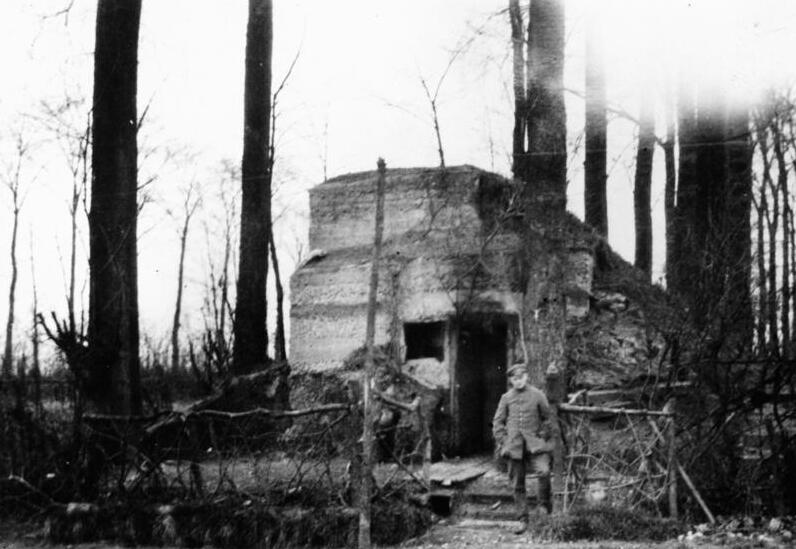
A German concrete strongpoint in the Fromelles salient, July 1916.

Unlike the 48th (SM) Division, which had over a year of trench service before undertaking its first attack, the 61st had only a matter of weeks. Each battalion did a short tour of duty for each battalion in the front line near Neuve Chapelle, and C Company of 2/4th Bn carried out a trench raid on 4/5 July, 'led with great dash and gallantry' Capt Frank Hannam, who died of his wounds and was unsuccessfully recommended for a posthumous Victoria Cross. The division was then thrown into the Attack at Fromelles on 19 July, a diversionary attack to relieve pressure on the Somme front. The attacking troops were committed to a short advance over flat, waterlogged country against strong defences including concrete machine gun emplacements. The attack was timed for 17.30 on 19 July, after several days' bombardment of the enemy wire and breastworks. 2/4th Gloucesters were among the attacking battalions, and suffered from German shellfire while they waited all day in their jumping-off positions. When the signal was given to advance the men were hit by Shrapnel shells as they tried to exit the Sally ports, and these had to be abandoned and the men went 'over the top' of the parapet. Once in No man's land the machine gun fire was so intense that they made no progress. The attack was a disaster, the assaulting battalions taking very heavy casualties. 61st (2nd SM) Division was only used for trench-holding for the rest of the year.

==== Ypres and Cambrai ====
In March and April 1917, the battalion saw action in the advance following the German retreat to the Hindenburg Line. On the night of 5/6 April, 183rd Bde was supposed to attack Fresnoy-le-Petit but patrols reported it abandoned. The barrage was cancelled but the troops sent to occupy the village found the eastern half strongly held and wired. The following night 2/4th Gloucesters and 2/8th Worcesters advanced behind a barrage to capture the village, but the wire was uncut and all that could be done was to dig in in front of it and hold the western half. It required a third night operation to complete the capture of Fresnoy and the trenches either side of it.

61st (2nd SM) Division went into reserve at Arras in mid-May, considerably under strength, but new drafts arrived in July. It then moved to Ypres and was put in as a fresh formation at the end of the Battle of Langemarck. On 17 August 2/4th Gloucesters went into the line in the Wieltje sector. Two days later, B Company attacked in conjunction with 48th (1st SM) Division on their left. Its objective was Pond Farm Galleries but it met strong opposition and uncut wire and withdrew. The battalion returned to the attack on 27 August: its assembly was disrupted when it was shelled before Zero hour, and the CO, Lt-Col Raymond Boulton, reported that the jumping-off line was a series of shell holes knee-deep in water, while a swamp divided the battalion into two halves. Although the barrage at 01.55 was accurate the men could not keep up with it because of the mud, while their rifles and machine guns became clogged with mud. The battalion made little progress before it was stopped and had to dig in where it stood, having suffered many casualties. 61st Division took part in a minor operation on 10 September, and was then relieved on 18 September and returned to Arras.

After the Ypres offensive ended, 61st (2nd SM) Division moved south to relieve British formations exhausted by German counter-attacks after the Battle of Cambrai. 183rd Brigade took over the line in front of La Vacquerie after dark on 1 December. 2/4th and 2/6th Gloucesters were the only battalions sent in initially, and it was a difficult relief: some of the troops being relieved could not be found, there was no wire in front of 2/4th's position, and two so-called communication trenches, 'Barrier Trench' and 'Village Lane' led straight into the battalion's position from the German side. There were intermittent bombing fights along these trenches next day, and at 08.25 on 3 December the Germans threw in a heavy attack. They advanced in waves over open ground and suffered heavy casualties from the British artillery, rifles and machine guns. 2/4th Gloucesters held for some time, but the Germans bombed their way up Barrier Trench and Village Lane and gained the upper hand. The battalion was forced to retire from La Vacquerie and the right-hand company was virtually cut off. The support company, reinforced by the battalion's cooks, signallers and sanitary men, was hopelessly outnumbered and forced out of the reserve trench. Eventually the CO, Lt-Col Donald Barnsley, was able to gather a few men and hold a position at 'Corner Work' on the slopes of Welsh Ridge. The Germans had also suffered heavily, and did not attack again; the battalion was relieved that night. The division continued to hold its positions until the fighting died down a few days later.

==== Disbandment ====
Due to the manpower shortage being suffered by the BEF, 183rd Bde was broken up on 20 February 1918, the men of 2/4th and 2/6th Gloucesters being distributed to the 2/5th Gloucesters and to No 55 Infantry Base Depot, with the remainder joining the rest of the brigade in the 24th Entrenching Battalion.

During its service 228 men of the battalion are known to have died.

=== 3/4th (City of Bristol) Battalion ===
The 3rd Line battalions of the Gloucesters formed at their depots during 1915 (the 3/4th on 1 May) and moved to Weston-super-Mare where they spent the winter of 1915–16. On 8 April 1916 they were redesignated Reserve Battalions, and on 1 September at Ludgershall, Wiltshire, the 4th (City of Bristol) Reserve Bn absorbed the former 3/5th and 3/6th in the South Midland Reserve Brigade. The 4th Reserve Bn then moved to Cheltenham in the winter of 1916–17, to Catterick Garrison in March 1917, to Horton in July 1917, and finally to Seaton Delaval in October 1917 for duty with the Tyne Garrison. The battalion continued to train drafts for service overseas until it disbanded on 19 April 1919 at Seaton Delaval.

=== 17th Battalion ===
The remaining Home Service men were separated from the 3rd Line battalions in May 1915 and formed into Provisional Battalions for home defence. The men of 4th Gloucesters joined with those from the rest of the Gloucester and Worcester Brigade (6th Gloucesters and 7th and 8th Worcestershire Regiment) to form 82nd Provisional Battalion in 7th Provisional Brigade.

The Military Service Act 1916 swept away the Home/Foreign service distinction, and all TF soldiers became liable for overseas service, if medically fit. The Provisional Battalions thus became anomalous, and at the end of 1916 became numbered battalions of their parent unit, the 82nd becoming 17th Battalion Gloucestershire Regiment. Part of the unit's role was physical conditioning to render men fit for drafting oversea, and 17th Gloucesters remained in the East Coast defences at Clacton-on-Sea and later at St Osyth for the rest of the war. It was disbanded on 6 May 1919.

== Interwar ==
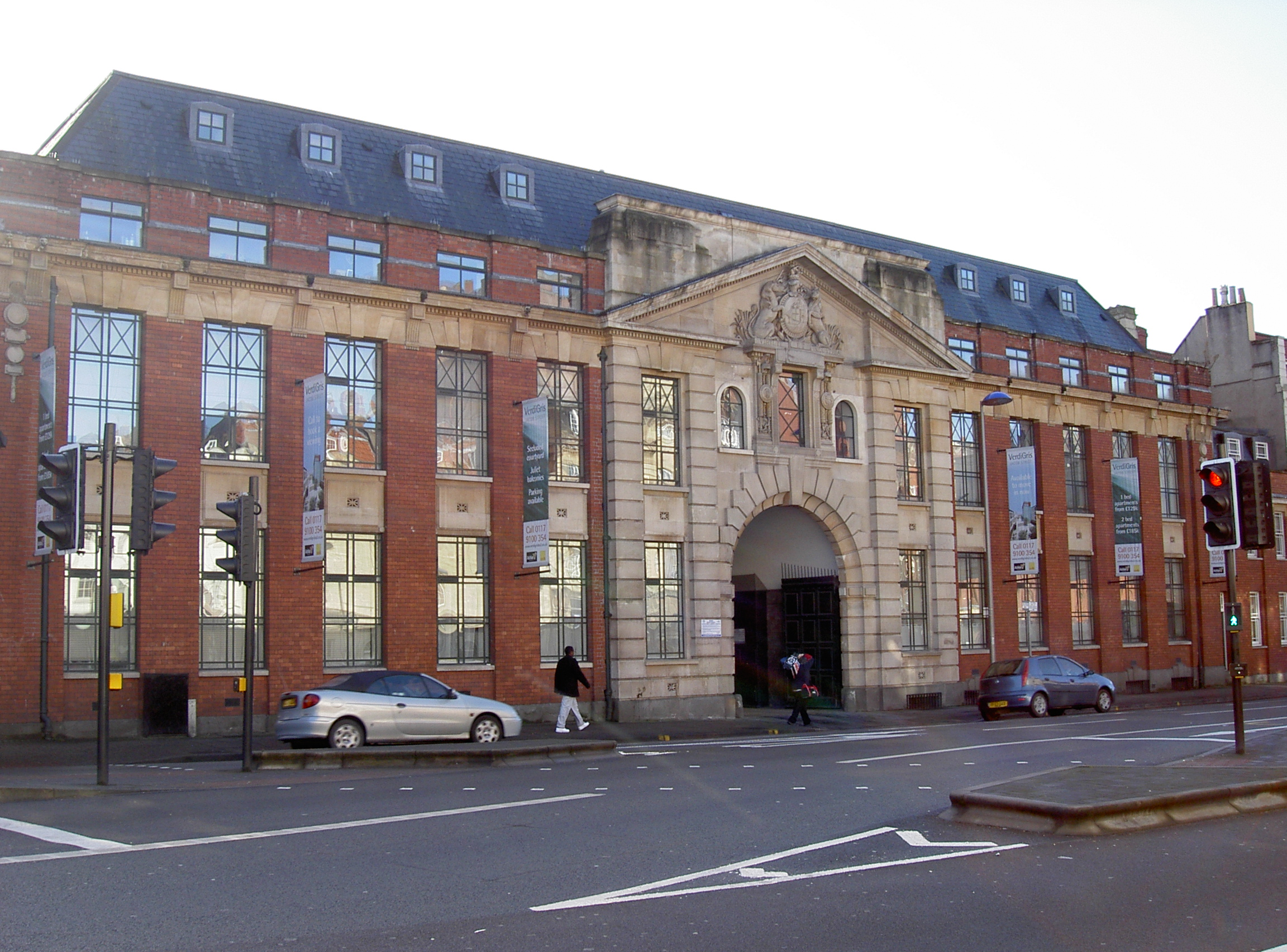
Old Market Street drill hall

The 4th Gloucesters reformed on 7 February 1920 in the TF (Territorial Army (TA) from 1921). The battalion's drill hall had been bought by Bristol Museum and Bristol University just before the war, and a new drill hall was built in Old Market Street. During the 1920s the cadet corps of Colston's School and Kingswood Training School were affiliated to the battalion.

=== 66th Searchlight Regiment ===
In the 1930s the increasing need for anti-aircraft (AA) defence for Britain's cities was addressed by converting a number of TA infantry battalions into searchlight (S/L) units. The 4th Gloucesters was one unit selected for this role, becoming 4th (City of Bristol) Battalion, Gloucestershire Regiment (66th Searchlight Regiment) on 1 November 1938, with HQ, 447, 448 and 449 S/L Companies at Bristol. It formed part of 46th Anti-Aircraft Brigade in 5 AA Division. The brigade commanded the 'Bristol Defended Area', including potential targets such as Avonmouth Docks and the Bristol Aeroplane Company factory at Filton Aerodrome.

== World War II ==
=== Mobilisation and Phoney War ===
90 cm Projector Anti-Aircraft, displayed at Fort Nelson, Portsmouth

In February 1939 the existing AA defences came under the control of a new Anti-Aircraft Command and In June a partial mobilisation of TA units was begun in a process known as 'couverture', whereby each AA unit did a month's tour of duty in rotation to man selected AA and searchlight positions. On 24 August, ahead of the declaration of war, AA Command was fully mobilised at its war stations.

In the near-total absence of light AA (LAA) guns, detachments from other units were deployed with Lewis guns (LGs) during October and November 1939 to cover various Royal Air Force (RAF) airfields and aircraft factories designated as Vulnerable Points (VPs). Men from the battalion manned the following VPs:

- 16 x LGs at Gloster Aircraft Factory, Hucclecote
- 16 x LGs at Rotol Airscrews, Cheltenham
- LGs at RAF Hullavington

These responsibilities were handed over to specialist LAA units in February 1940. As part of the rapid expansion of AA Command, the battalion provided a cadre of trained officers and men to form the basis of a new AA company in mid-January. On 1 August all S/L units were transferred to the Royal Artillery (RA), and the battalion became 66th (Gloucesters) Searchlight Regiment, RA, with the three companies redesignated as S/L batteries

Once the Phoney War ended with the German invasion of the Low Countries on 10 May, 5th AA Division's units were ordered to form picquets and flying columns equipped with rifles and LGs to combat the threat from enemy paratroop landings. After the Occupation of France, Luftwaffe aircraft began to penetrate the Bristol area, with nuisance raids almost nightly as the Battle of Britain got under way in July. AA gun and S/L engagements with these raiders were frequent but inconclusive.

=== Battle of Britain ===
Most actions during the Battle of Britain were over south and south-east England, where RAF airfields were the main targets for day bombers. The Bristol AA guns were in action on the night of 24/25 August, and again on the night of 28/29 August, when radar tracked 43 separate 'raids' (mostly single aircraft) over 46 AA Bde's area, but most avoided the Bristol GDA on their way to other targets (Liverpool was the main Luftwaffe target that night). Only one raider was caught by the Bristol S/Ls while others were engaged by radar-directed Heavy AA (HAA) guns. The bombs dropped in the area mainly landed in open country.

There were a few daylight raids in the West Country as the battle continued, notably on Bristol on 25 September, which severely damaged the aircraft works at Filton, but the Luftwaffe had by then lost the daylight Battle of Britain and turned to the night bombing of The Blitz, mainly directed against London, though there were scattered night raiders in the Bristol area.

8th AA Division's formation sign.

=== The Blitz ===
At this period 66th S/L Rgt was deployed as follows:

- Regimental HQ (RHQ): Badminton School, Westbury-on-Trym
- Battery HQ (BHQ) 447/66 S/L Bty: Drill Hall, Speedwell, Bristol
- BHQ 448/66 S/L Bty: Banwell Abbey, Banwell
- BHQ 449/66 S/L Bty: Wookey Hole

In October 448 and 449 S/L Btys experimented with new positions to improve the belts of illumination for RAF night fighters. The S/L layouts had initially been based on a spacing of 3,500 yards (3,200 m), but due to equipment shortages this had been extended to 6,000 yards (5,500 m) by September 1940. In November AA Command changed this to clusters of three lights to improve illumination, but this meant that the clusters had to be spaced 10,400 yards (9,500 m) apart. The cluster system was an attempt to improve the chances of picking up enemy bombers and keeping them illuminated for engagement by AA guns or night fighters. Eventually, one light in each cluster was to be equipped with Searchlight Control (SLC) radar and act as 'master light', but the radar equipment was still in short supply.

The expansion of AA defences meant that 5th AA Division was split up on 1 November 1940, with 46 AA Bde and 66 S/L Rgt coming under a new 8th Anti-Aircraft Division, which took responsibility for the City of Bristol and the counties of Somerset, Dorset, Devon and Cornwall. In November 1940 the regiment sent cadre No 54, consisting of seven officers and 45 other ranks, to form a new battery at 232nd S/L Training Rgt, Devizes. This battery, 524 S/L Bty, formed on 14 November 1940 and later joined 63rd (Queen's) S/L Rgt.

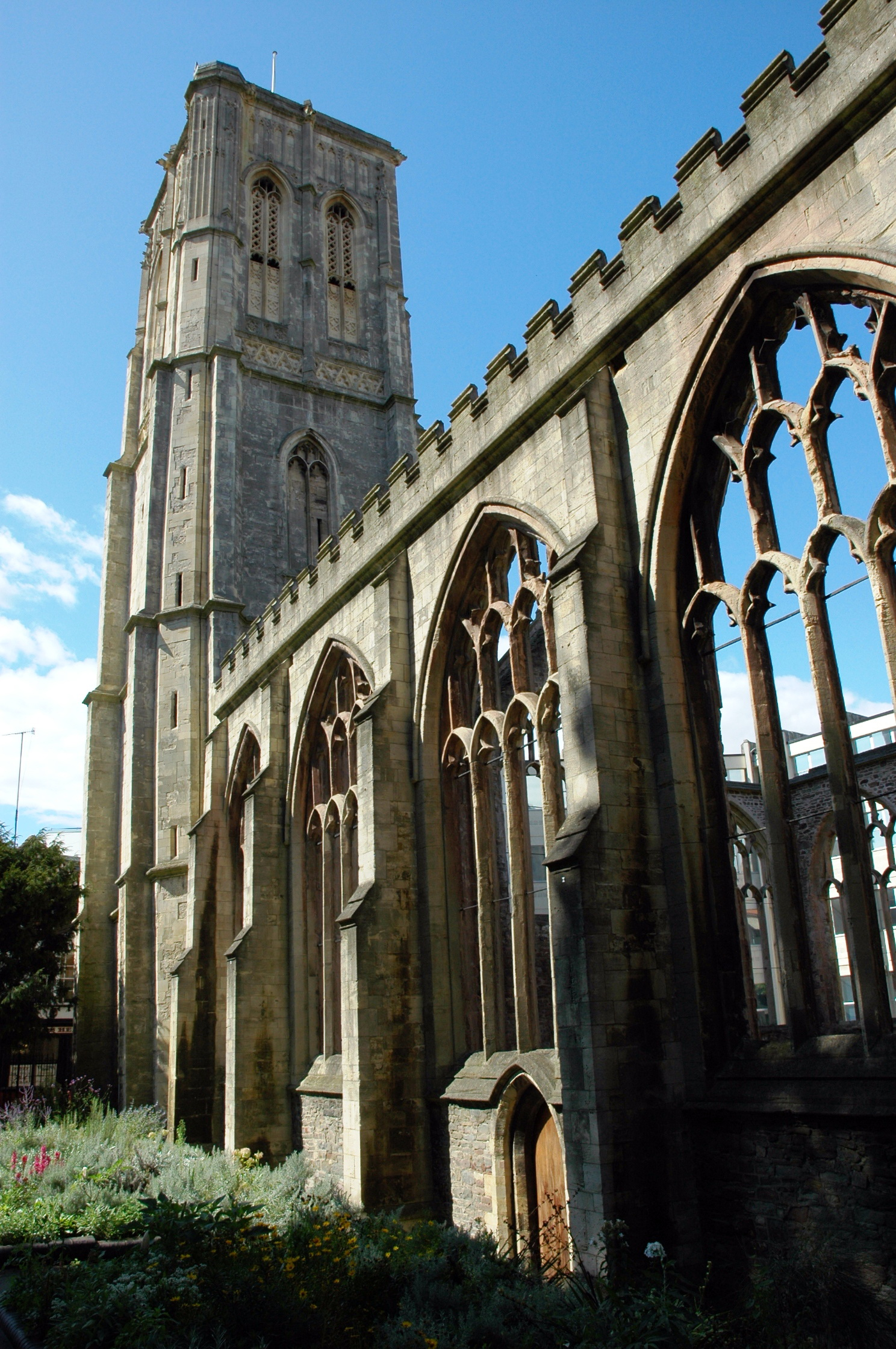
The Blitzed ruins of Temple Church, Bristol.

Although the main weight of the Blitz fell on London, Bristol was a major target. The city was bombed heavily on 24/25 November, 2/3 and 6/7 December, and 3/4 January 1941, while Avonmouth was hit on 4/5 and 16/17 January. After a lull in February, Bristol and Avonmouth were hit again on 16/17 March, 3/4, 4/5 and 11/12 April (the Bristol Blitz). Other raids passed over the Bristol area on their way to targets in Northern England. By now, the success rates for the AA guns and night fighters guided by radar and S/Ls were rising steadily and Luftwaffe casualties increased.

=== Mid-War ===
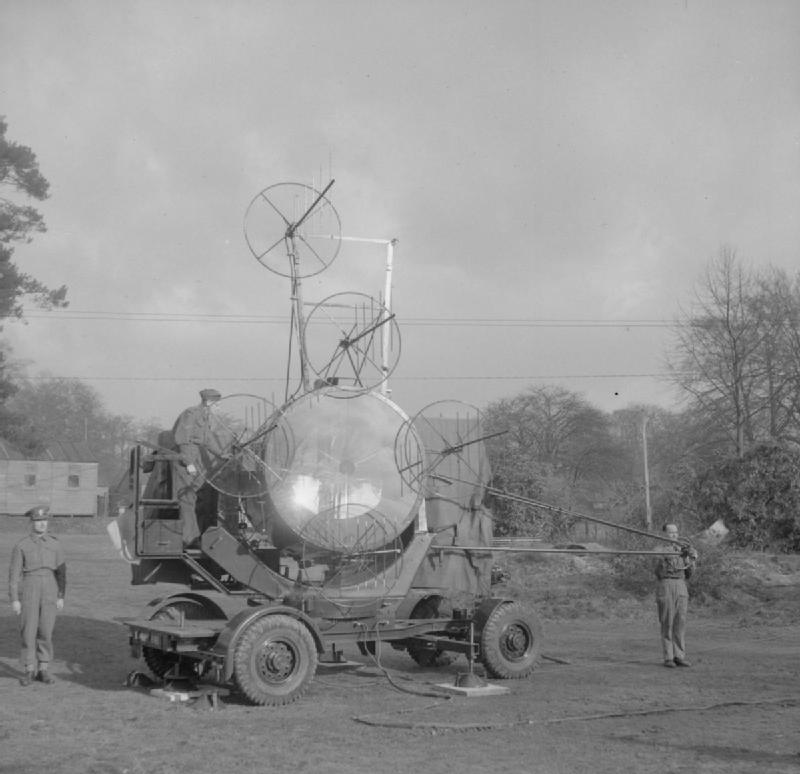
150 cm Searchlight with AA Radar No 2.

The Blitz ended in May 1941, but AA Command continued to increase its capabilities. A new 559 S/L Bty formed on 13 February 1941 at 236th S/L Training Rgt, Oswestry, from a cadre supplied by 74th (Essex Fortress) S/L Rgt. This battery was then regimented with 66th S/L Rgt on 5 May 1941. At his time 447/66 S/L Bty was temporarily attached to the neighbouring 64 AA Bde. Then a new 69 AA Bde was formed, and on 1 September it took over command of 46 AA Bde's S/L units, including 66th S/L Rgt, which was redeployed to new sites. By October the availability of SLC radar was sufficient to allow AA Command's S/L sites to be 'declustered' into single-light sites spaced at 10,400 yards (9,500 m) intervals in 'Indicator Belts' along the coast and approaches to the GDAs, and 'Killer Belts' at 6,000 yards (5,500 m) spacing to cooperate with the RAF's night-fighters.

Early in 1942 the Luftwaffe began a new wave of attacks on British cities (the Baedeker Blitz). These concentrated on lightly defended targets and avoided the known GDAs like Bristol, but nearby Bath was hit on two successive nights in April and Weston-super-Mare in June, with some misdirected bombs hitting Bristol as well.

By mid-1943, AA Command was being forced to release manpower for overseas service, particularly Operation Overlord (the planned Allied invasion of Normandy) and most S/L regiments lost one of their four batteries. On 25 February 1944 559 S/L Bty commenced disbandment, completed by 24 March. The rest of the regiment remained in 69 AA Bde, now part of 3 AA Group, until early April 1944, when it came under 64 AA Bde.

=== Baby Blitz ===
In early 1944 the Luftwaffe launched the so-call Baby Blitz against British cities. Bristol was attacked on the nights of 27/28 March, 23 April and 14 May, but the defences were stronger than in 1941, with plentiful SLC radar to point the S/Ls. For example, the March attack directed at Bristol consisted of 80 raiders, but as they approached over Dorset they were broken up by the well-directed AA guns and night-fighters: two were shot down, the others scattered their bombs in open country, and one reached the city.

=== Operation Diver ===
AA Command had plenty of warning that the Germans were developing V-1 flying bombs to use against the UK, and had detailed plans in place (Operation Diver). This included defences for Bristol comprising successive defence belts across the anticipated flight paths, consisting of S/Ls and LAA guns, then HAA and LAA guns, followed by Barrage balloons and Z Battery rockets before the missiles reached the Bristol GDA. The V-1s began arriving on 13 June 1944, a week after the Allies had launched their invasion of Normandy on D Day. Operation Diver was put into effect, but the offensive against Bristol never got under way, because US forces quickly captured the launch sites on the Cherbourg peninsula.

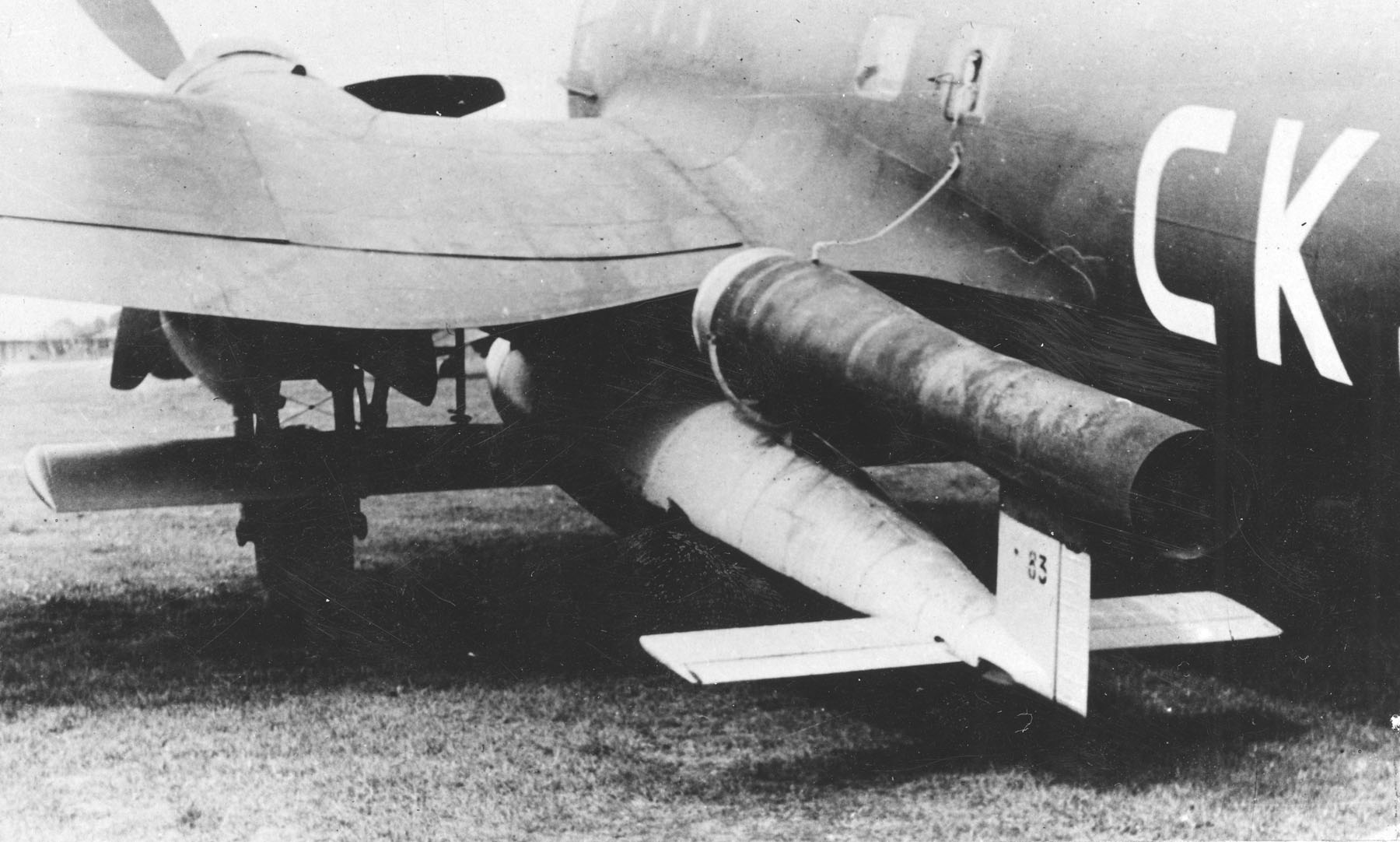
A Heinkel He 111 carrying an underwing V-1 flying bomb.

The first V-1 offensive was concentrated against London, and continued until the launching sites in Northern France were overrun by 21st Army Group. The Luftwaffe then began launching the missiles from aircraft over the North Sea, and on 21 September AA Command ordered a major redeployment of AA defences to East Anglia from other parts of the country, including Bristol, where 3 AA Group HQ and 66th S/L Rgt were moved across. On 23 September the regiment was reinforced by E Trp of the disbanding 461 S/L Bty of 70th (Sussex) S/L Rgt, which joined as E/448 Trp. On arrival, 66th S/L Rgt joined 56 AA Brigade in 1 AA Gp. So many units were crowded into Eastern England that a new HQ, 9 AA Gp, was created to control the defences of East Anglia, including 56 AA Bde. This second phase of V-1 attacks ended in mid-January 1945. AA Command's success rate in this phase was impressive: out of a total of 492 V-1 targets, 320 were shot down, and only 13 reached London.

In the last winter of the war, the S/L belt along the East Coast was thickened up to deal with Luftwaffe intruder raids mixing with returning aircraft of RAF Bomber Command to attack their airfields. A last gasp of V-1 attacks was launched from sites in the Netherlands in early March, 1945, but by now AA Command's success rate against these missiles was 80–100 per cent.

AA Command's operational responsibilities ended with VE Day, and many of its remaining units were rapidly wound down. RHQ of 66th S/L Rgt and 447, 448 and 449 S/L Btys began entering suspended animation at Shouldham, near King's Lynn, on 16 May 1945, and the process was completed by 17 October 1945.

== Postwar ==
When the TA was reconstituted on 1 January 1947, 66th S/L Rgt was reformed as 601st (City of Bristol) (Mixed) Heavy Anti-Aircraft Regiment, Royal Artillery ('Mixed' indicating that members of the Women's Royal Army Corps were integrated into the unit). Now equipped with HAA guns rather than S/Ls it formed part of Bristol-based 72 AA Bde (the wartime 46 AA Bde).

When AA Command was disbanded on 10 March 1955 there were wholescale mergers among its subordinate units: 601 (City of Bristol) HAA Rgt amalgamated with 312th (Gloucestershire) and 266th (Gloucestershire Volunteer Artillery) HAA Rgts to form 311th (City of Bristol) Heavy Anti-Aircraft Regiment, Royal Artillery, to which it contributed R (City of Bristol) Bty.

On 1 May 1961 there was a further reorganisation: part of the regiment merged with 883 (Bristol) Locating Bty to form 883 (Gloucestershire Volunteer Artillery) Locating Bty, while R Bty reverted to infantry and merged with two companies of 5th Gloucesters, retaining the City of Bristol title. Despite several further mergers, B Company of 2nd Bn Royal Gloucestershire, Berkshire and Wiltshire Regiment kept its 'City of Bristol' subtitle until the battalion was amalgamated in 1999.

Although the City of Bristol lineage was discontinued, the regiment's successors, 6th (V) Btn, The Rifles maintains No.3 (Rifle) Platoon of A Company, based in Gloucester, in the City of Bristol at HMS Flying Fox.

== Uniforms and insignia ==
The Bristol Volunteer Infantry of 1797 wore a red uniform with yellow facings. When the unit was re-raised in 1803 as the Royal Bristol Volunteers, the facing colour was changed to the blue appropriate to a 'Royal' regiment; the breeches were white and the officers' lace was silver. The Loyal Westbury Volunteers adopted scarlet jackets with yellow skirts, pantaloons of dark mixture cloth and officers' epaulettes in gilt. However, after uniting with the Clifton Volunteers the uniform changed to blue facings, light blue breeches, and silver lace. Jervis's Somerset Riflemen followed the fashion of the Rifle Brigade by wearing Rifle green jackets and breeches with black facings and lace.

The uniform of the City of Bristol Rifles from 1859 was Rifle green with green facings. On the formation of the TF in 1908 the 4th Bn gave up its green uniform and adopted the full dress uniform of the 'Glosters': scarlet with white facings. The facings changed to Primrose yellow in 1929. In 1918 the contribution of the TF battalions during World War I was recognised when they were permitted to adopt the famous 'Back Badge' of the Glosters (worn on the back of the headgear to commemorate the back-to-back fight of the 28th Foot at the Battle of Alexandria, 1801).

In 1953 a supplementary arm title was officially approved for wear by 601 HAA Rgt, consisting of 'CITY OF BRISTOL' embroidered in black on a rifle green backing; it was worn on the sleeve of the battledress just beneath the embroidered Royal Artillery title.

== Honorary Colonel ==
The Honorary Colonel of the battalion, from the days of the Royal Bristol Volunteers to the amalgamation of 601 (City of Bristol) HAA Regiment, was always the serving Mayor (from 1899 Lord Mayor) of Bristol.

== Battle Honours ==
The City of Bristol Rifles were awarded the following Battle Honours:

- South Africa 1900–1902

1/4th Battalion

- France and Flanders 1915–17
- Ypres 1917
  - Langemarck 1917
  - Broodseinde
  - Poelcapelle
- Somme 1916
  - Albert 1916
  - Bazentin
  - Pozières
- Italy 1917–18
  - Piave
  - Vittorio-Veneto

2/4th Battalion

- France and Flanders 1916–18
- Ypres 1917
  - Langemarck 1917
- Cambrai 1917

The Royal Artillery does not carry Battle Honours, so none were awarded to 66th (Gloucesters) Searchlight Regiment during World War II

== Notes ==
- Army Council Instructions Issued During January 1916, London: HM Stationery Office, 1916.
- Maj A.F. Becke,History of the Great War: Order of Battle of Divisions, Part 2a: The Territorial Force Mounted Divisions and the 1st-Line Territorial Force Divisions (42–56), London: HM Stationery Office, 1935/Uckfield: Naval & Military Press, 2007, ISBN 1-847347-39-8.
- Maj A.F. Becke,History of the Great War: Order of Battle of Divisions, Part 2b: The 2nd-Line Territorial Force Divisions (57th–69th), with the Home-Service Divisions (71st–73rd) and 74th and 75th Divisions, London: HM Stationery Office, 1937/Uckfield: Naval & Military Press, 2007, ISBN 1-847347-39-8.
- Ian F.W. Beckett, Riflemen Form: A study of the Rifle Volunteer Movement 1859–1908, Aldershot: Ogilby Trusts, 1982, ISBN 0 85936 271 X.
- Ian F.W. Beckett, The Amateur Military Tradition 1558–1945, Manchester: Manchester University Press, 1991, ISBN 0-7190-2912-0.
- Basil Collier, History of the Second World War, United Kingdom Military Series: The Defence of the United Kingdom, London: HM Stationery Office, 1957.
- Bryan Cooper, The Ironclads of Cambrai, London: Souvenir Press, 1967/Pan Books, 1970, ISBN 0-330-02579-1.
- David Scott Daniell, Cap of Honour: The Story of the Gloucestershire Regiment (The 28th/61st Foot) 1694–1950, London: Harrap, 1951.
- Brig-Gen Sir James E. Edmonds, History of the Great War: Military Operations, France and Belgium, 1916, Vol I, London: Macmillan,1932/Woking: Shearer, 1986, ISBN 0-946998-02-7.
- Brig-Gen Sir James E. Edmonds, History of the Great War: Military Operations, France and Belgium 1917, Vol II, Messines and Third Ypres (Passchendaele), London: HM Stationery Office, 1948/Uckfield: Imperial War Museum and Naval and Military Press, 2009, ISBN 978-1-845747-23-7.
- Brig-Gen Sir James E. Edmonds & Maj-Gen H.R. Davies, History of the Great War: Military Operations, Italy 1915–1919, London: HM Stationery Office, 1949/Imperial War Museum, 1992, ISBN 978-0-901627742.
- Capt Cyril Falls, History of the Great War: Military Operations, France and Belgium 1917, Vol I, The German Retreat to the Hindenburg Line and the Battle of Arras, London: Macmillan, 1940/London: Imperial War Museum & Battery Press/Uckfield: Naval and Military Press, 2009, ISBN 978-1-84574722-0.
- Gen Sir Martin Farndale, History of the Royal Regiment of Artillery: The Years of Defeat: Europe and North Africa, 1939–1941, Woolwich: Royal Artillery Institution, 1988/London: Brasseys, 1996, ISBN 1-85753-080-2.
- Sir John Fortescue, A History of the British Army, Vol IV, Pt I, 1789–1801, 2nd Edn, London: Macmillan, 1915.
- Sir John Fortescue, A History of the British Army, Vol IV, Pt II, 1789–1801, London: Macmillan, 1906.
- Sir John Fortescue, A History of the British Army, Vol V, 1803–1807, London: Macmillan, 1910.
- J.B.M. Frederick, Lineage Book of British Land Forces 1660–1978, Vol I, Wakefield, Microform Academic, 1984, ISBN 1-85117-007-3.
- J.B.M. Frederick, Lineage Book of British Land Forces 1660–1978, Vol II, Wakefield, Microform Academic, 1984, ISBN 1-85117-009-X.
- Robin Grist, A Gallant County: The Regiments of Gloucestershire in the Great War, Barnsley: Pen & Sword, 2018, ISBN 978-1-52673-607-9.
- Brig E.A. James, British Regiments 1914–18, Samson Books 1978/Uckfield: Naval & Military Press, 2001, ISBN 978-1-84342-197-9.
- N.B. Leslie, Battle Honours of the British and Indian Armies 1695–1914, London: Leo Cooper, 1970, ISBN 0-85052-004-5
- Norman E.H. Litchfield, The Territorial Artillery 1908–1988 (Their Lineage, Uniforms and Badges), Nottingham: Sherwood Press, 1992, ISBN 0-9508205-2-0.
- Capt Wilfred Miles, History of the Great War: Military Operations, France and Belgium 1916, Vol II, 2nd July 1916 to the End of the Battles of the Somme, London: Macmillan, 1938/Imperial War Museum & Battery Press, 1992, ISBN 0-89839-169-5.
- Capt Wilfred Miles, History of the Great War: Military Operations, France and Belgium 1917, Vol III, The Battle of Cambrai, London: HM Stationery Office, 1948/Uckfield: Naval and Military Press, 2009, ISBN 978-1-84574724-4.
- Gen Sir Frederick Pile's despatch: "The Anti-Aircraft Defence of the United Kingdom from 28th July, 1939, to 15th April, 1945" London Gazette 18 December 1947
- Brig N.W. Routledge, History of the Royal Regiment of Artillery: Anti-Aircraft Artillery 1914–55, London: Royal Artillery Institution/Brassey's, 1994, ISBN 1-85753-099-3.
- Edward M. Spiers, The Army and Society 1815–1914, London: Longmans, 1980, ISBN 0-582-48565-7.
- Ray Westlake, Tracing the Rifle Volunteers, Barnsley: Pen and Sword, 2010, ISBN 978-1-84884-211-3.
- Everard Wyrall, The Gloucestershire Regiment in the War 1914–1918, London: Methuen, 1931/Uckfield: Naval & Military, 2003, ISBN 978-1-84342-572-4.

== Online sources ==
- The Drill Hall Project
- Great War Centenary Drill Halls
- The Long, Long Trail
- Land Forces of Britain, the Empire and Commonwealth – Regiments.org (archive site)
- Mark Conrad, The British Army, 1914 (archive site)
- David Porter's work on Provisional Brigades at Great War Forum Archived 10 October 2017 at the Wayback Machine
