= Trust Inns =

British pub company

Trust Inns Ltd is a pub company based in Chorley, Lancashire. Trust Inns owns over 350 pubs in England, Wales and Scotland. Trust Inns specialises in buying pubs and then renting them to tenants, who pay rent to Trust Inns while they live in and run the pubs.

== History ==
The company was established as the Pub Estates Group in 1995 specifically to purchase a portfolio of pubs from the Scottish & Newcastle brewery. The company subsequently purchased further pubs from drinks company Allied Domecq and Go-Ahead Leisure.

It changed its name to Trust Inns in September 2004.

Mitchells & Butlers sold 102 pubs to Trust Inns in 2006 for £101 million.
