= Court of piepowders =

English court

Courts of Pyepowder Act 1477
- Act of Parliament
- Parliament of England
- Long title: An Act for the courts of pipowders.
- Citation: 17 Edw. 4 c. 2
- Territorial extent: England and Wales; Ireland

Dates
- Royal assent: 26 February 1478
- Commencement: 16 January 1478 (Note: Start of session.)
- Repealed: 30 July 1948
Other legislation
Repealed by	Statute Law Revision Act 1948
Relates to	Courts of Pyepowder Act 1483

Status: Repealed

Text of statute as originally enacted

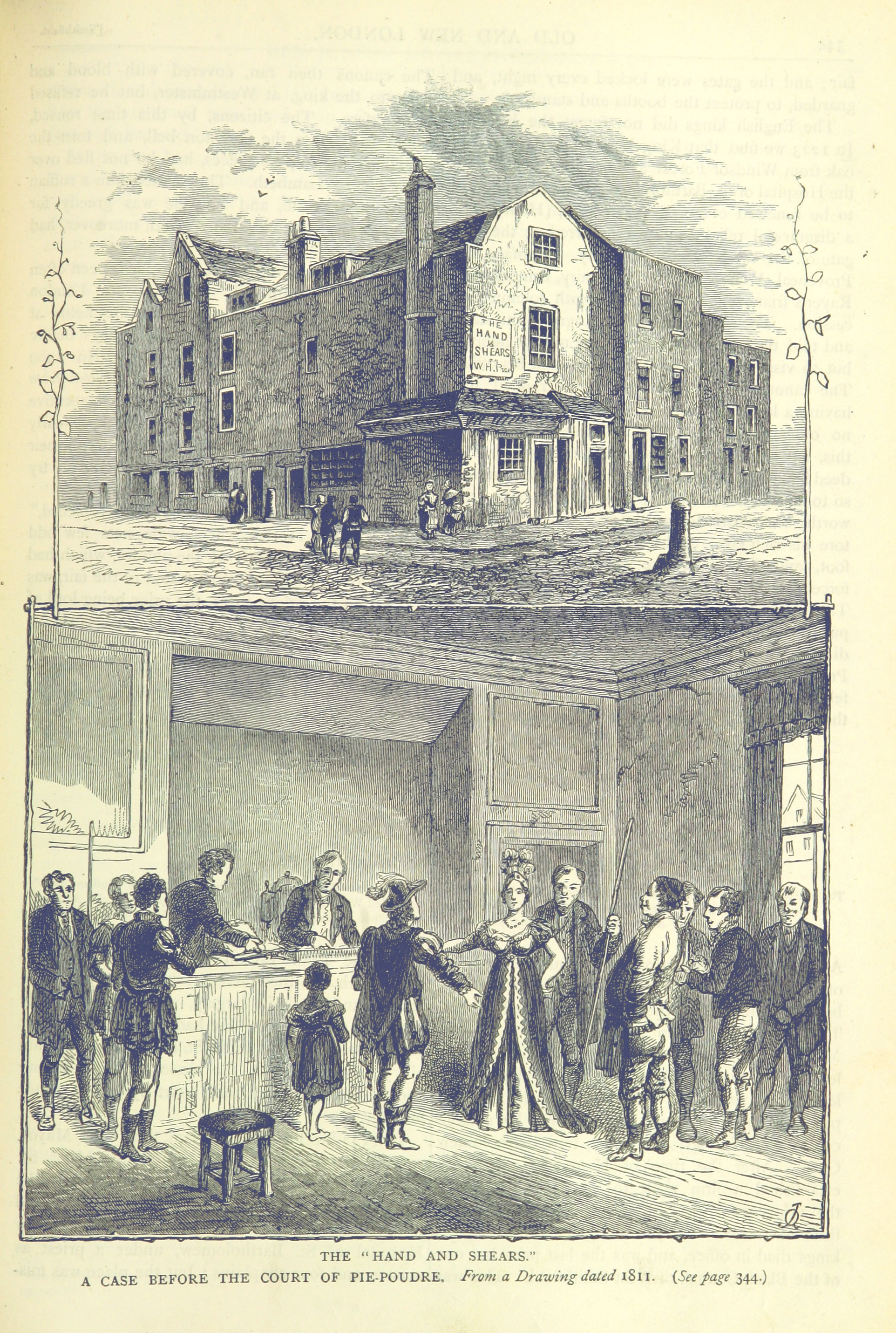
A case before the court of Pie-Poudre, at the "Hand and Shears" during the Bartholomew Fair from a drawing dated 1811

A court of piepowders was a special tribunal in England organised by a borough on the occasion of a fair or market. Such a court had unlimited jurisdiction over personal actions or events taking place at the market, including disputes between merchants, theft, and acts of violence. Many hundreds of such courts operated in the Middle Ages, and a small number continued to exist even into modern times. Sir William Blackstone's Commentaries on the Laws of England in 1768 described this court as "the lowest, and at the same time the most expeditious, court of justice known to the law of England".

Courts of piepowders had declined in use by the 17th century.

== Trial and procedure ==
A piepowder court was held in front of the mayor and bailiffs of the borough, or the steward, if the market or fair was held by a lord. The number of justiciars often varied but was usually limited to three or four men. Punishments typically included fines and the possibility of being held in a pillory or being drawn in a tumbrel, a two-wheeled cart, in order to humiliate the offender. More serious crimes would often be reserved for the royal justices, but sometimes the jurisdiction was still held by a piepowder court.

When the time came for the trial, both parties would be summoned; typically, the defendants would be summoned an hour earlier. Here, the burden of proof was on the plaintiff with documents and witnesses often being provided as evidence. After the plaintiff made his case, the defendant then had the right to respond to the accusation and counter with evidence of his own. This method of proof was actually rather advanced for its time. When it came to evidence in other European courts, things such as compurgation, which is the defendant taking an oath over his stance and getting around twelve others to swear that they believe him, were still used in many cases.

Trials at courts of piepowders were short, quick and informal. In 12th century England and Scotland, a decision had to be made within a day and a half (before the third tide) of the accusation. If the court ruled against the defendant and the defendant could not pay the decided amount, his property could be seized, appraised, and sold to cover the costs.

== Decline ==
Courts of piepowders existed because of the necessity for speedy justice over people who were not permanent residents of the place where the market was held. By the seventeenth century, most of their powers had effectively been transferred to the regular court system, for practical reasons rather than as a result of legislation, the standard district courts being well established. The most recent sitting of a piepowder court was in 1898, in Hemel Hempstead.

The last "active" court of piepowders, at the Stag and Hounds Public House in Bristol, was abolished by the Courts Act 1971. It had not actually sat since 1870, but a proclamation was still read in the marketplace each year. All other courts had their jurisdiction removed by the Administration of Justice Act 1977, though they may technically continue to exist even in the absence of officers, cases, or premises.

== Toponymy ==
There is no one standard spelling of "piepowder": the most common variant is perhaps "pie poudre" (as in Bristol). In the past, variations included "pipoulder" in the sixteenth century, "pepowder" in the fifteenth, and "pipoudre" in the fourteenth. "Piepowder" is a modern respelling of the term based on more familiar English words. Originally, it referred to the dusty feet (in French, pieds poudrés) of travellers and vagabonds, and was only later applied to the courts who might have dealings with such people.

Also, since the members of courts of "piepowder", were not sitting on a bench, but walking around in fairs, they would often get their feet dusty. This can be another explanation of the name that is given by some common law history teachers. In modern French, the word pieds-poudreux is still occasionally used for travelling beggars; it occurs, for example, in the works of Victor Hugo. Another literary reference is Ben Jonson's Bartholomew Fair, in which Justice Adam Overdo patrols the fair in disguise, saying (Act 2, Scene 1):

Many are the yeerly enormities [crimes] of this Fayre, in whose Courts of Pye-pouldres I have had the honour during the three dayes sometimes to sit as Judge.

== Bibliography ==
- Halsbury's Laws of England: volume 12(1), paragraph 662, note 10; and volume 10, section titled "Inferior courts and tribunals and ancient courts", paragraph 851 and following.
- Oxford English Dictionary, second edition.
