= History of the courts of England and Wales =

Certain former courts of England and Wales have been abolished or merged into or with other courts, and certain other courts of England and Wales have fallen into disuse.

For just under 600 years, from the time of the Norman Conquest until 1642, French was the language of the courts, rather than English. Until the twentieth century, many legal terms were still expressed in Latin.

== Higher civil court system ==
=== Middle Ages ===
The royal court originated within the Curia Regis, which began during the twelfth and thirteenth centuries during the reign of Henry Plantagenet. Henry II made writs available for purchase by private individuals seeking justice, thus initiating a vast expansion of writs within the common law. The increased demand of judicial maters before the Curia Regis in the twelfth century led to the establishment of two central courts: the Court of King's Bench and the Court of Common Pleas. These courts became the superior courts to all other courts in England, including local and tribunal courts such as the Hundred Courts and Court of Piepowders.

- The Court of King's Bench heard all complaints and pleas addressed to the King. This court was also known as the Court of Queen's Bench during the reign of a female monarch. Members of this court included the King and his closest advisors. This court always travelled with the King as he travelled throughout England and into other countries. When the Lord Chancellor issued the writ to the court of King's Bench, the original full name of the writ was quae coram nobis resident or "Let the record remain before us". The words "let the record remain" indicate the court record of the original case remained with the court of King's Bench, unlike a writ of error, where the record moved to a different court. The words "coram nobis" referred to the role of the King who served on the King's Bench. The King's place on the court of King's Bench became increasingly irregular; and by 1421, the King's Bench became a fixed court rather than one that followed the King. Although the King's presence was theoretical, the Lord Chancellor and his office continued to issue writs as if the King continued to as part of this court.
- The Court of Common Pleas was authorized by Magna Carta to sit in a central, fixed location. This court heard complaints and pleas that did not require the King's presence. When the Lord Chancellor issued the writ to the court of Common Pleas, the original full name was quae coram vobis resident, or "Let the record remain before you". These words indicate that the records of the original case remained with the judges of the Court of Common Pleas so that it may review a case it previously decided to determine if an error of fact occurred.

==== Henry VIII ====
- Court of Augmentations
- Court of First Fruits and Tenths
- Court of General Surveyors
- Court of Wards and Liveries

==== Conciliar courts ====
Conciliar courts included the Court of Star Chamber and the Court of Requests.

===== Regional conciliar courts =====
These included the Council in the North Parts and the Council in the Principality and Marches of Wales.

==== Superior courts at Westminster ====
Although the words "Superior Courts of Law at Westminster", in the preamble of the Uniformity of Process Act 1832 were, it was conceived by Palmer, sufficient to comprehend the law side of the Court of Chancery or Petty Bag Office, that Court being undoubtedly one of His Majesty's superior Courts at Westminster, yet it was evident, from section 12, as well as other parts of the statute, that the three courts of King's Bench, Common Pleas, and Exchequer, were those which were alone meant by it.

Wharton and Granger refer to "the three superior courts at Westminster".

Section 2 of the Evidence Act 1845 refers to "any of the equity or common law judges of the superior courts at Westminster". The effect of section 151(5) of, and paragraph 1(1) of Schedule 4 to, the Senior Courts Act 1981 and sections 18(2) and 26(2) of the Supreme Court of Judicature (Consolidation) Act 1925, is that the expression "any of the equity or common law judges of the superior courts at Westminster" must be construed and have effect as a reference to judges of the Court of Appeal and High Court.

The superior courts of law at Westminster had a common jurisdiction over certain actions and proceedings.

The Court of King's Bench, Court of Common Pleas, Court of Exchequer and Court of Chancery sat at Westminster Hall.

=== Supreme Court of Judicature Act 1873 ===
==== Transfer of jurisdiction to the High Court ====
The jurisdiction of the following courts was transferred to the High Court of Justice by section 16 of the Supreme Court of Judicature Act 1873:

- The High Court of Chancery, as a Common Law Court as well as a Court of Equity, including the jurisdiction of the Master of the Rolls, as a Judge or Master of the Court of Chancery, and any jurisdiction exercised by him in relation to the Court of Chancery as a Common Law Court
- The Court of Queen's Bench
- The Court of Common Pleas at Westminster
- The Court of Exchequer, as a Court of Revenue, as well as a Common Law Court
- The High Court of Admiralty
- The Court of Probate
- The Court for Divorce and Matrimonial Causes
- The Court of Common Pleas at Lancaster
- The Court of Pleas at Durham
- The Courts created by Commissions of Assize, of Oyer and Terminer, and of Gaol Delivery, or any of such Commissions

The jurisdiction of the London Bankruptcy Court was transferred to the High Court by section 93 of the Bankruptcy Act 1883.

The following courts were merged into the High Court by section 41 of the Courts Act 1971:

- The Court of Chancery of the County Palatine of Lancaster
- The Court of Chancery of the County Palatine of Durham and Sadberge

==== Appellate courts ====
The jurisdictions of the following, amongst others, were transferred to the Court of Appeal:

- The Court of Exchequer Chamber
- The Court of Appeal in Chancery
- The Court of Appeal in Chancery of the County Palatine of Lancaster
- The Lord Warden of the Stannaries

There was formerly a Court for Crown Cases Reserved. The House of Lords was formerly an appellate court.

== Courts of criminal jurisdiction ==
Courts of criminal jurisdiction included:

- Courts of summary jurisdiction
- Quarter and General sessions
- Special sessions
- Courts of Gaol Delivery and Oyer and Terminer
- Petty sessions
- Assizes

=== Central Criminal Court ===
The Central Criminal Court established by the Central Criminal Court Act 1834 was replaced by the Crown Court established by the recommendations of Dr. Beeching leading to the Courts Act 1971.

=== Crown courts ===
The Crown Court of Liverpool and the Crown Court of Manchester established by the Criminal Justice Administration Act 1956 were superseded by the (national) Crown Court established by the Courts Act 1971.

== Ecclesiastical courts ==
These included the Court of High Commission.

== Bankruptcy courts ==
The Court of Bankruptcy was established under the statute 1 & 2 Will 4 c 56. As to bankruptcy courts, see the Bankruptcy Act 1869.

== Lower courts ==
=== County courts ===
Some county courts in Wales have closed since 1846.

=== Local and borough courts of record ===
These included Courts of Pie Poudre and Courts of the Staple.

Section 42 of the Courts Act 1971 replaced the Mayor's and City of London Court with a county court of the same name.

Section 43 of that Act abolished:

- The Tolzey and Pie Poudre Courts of the City and County of Bristol
- The Liverpool Court of Passage
- The Norwich Guildhall Court
- The Court of Record for the Hundred of Salford

Section 221 of the Local Government Act 1972 abolished the borough civil courts listed in Schedule 28 to that Act.

==== Anomalous local courts ====
Part II of Schedule 4 to the Administration of Justice Act 1977 curtailed the jurisdiction of certain other anomalous local courts:

- Courts baron
- Courts leet
- Manorial courts customary
- Courts of piepowders
- Courts of the staple
- Courts of the clerk of the market
- Hundred courts
- Law Days
- Views of Frankpledge
- Common law (or sheriffs') county courts as known before the passing of the County Courts Act 1846 (9 & 10 Vict. c. 95).
- The Basingstoke Court of Ancient Demesne
- The Coventry Court of Orphans
- The Great Grimsby Foreign Court
- The King's Lynn Court of Tolbooth
- The Court of Husting (City of London)
- The Sheriffs' Court for the Poultry Compter (City of London)
- The Sheriffs' Court for the Giltspur Street Compter (City of London)
- The Macclesfield Court of Portmote
- The Maidstone Court of Conservancy
- The Melcombe Regis Court of Husting
- The Newcastle upon Tyne Court of Conscience or Requests
- The Newcastle upon Tyne Court of Conservancy
- The Norwich Court of Mayoralty
- The Peterborough Dean and Chapter's Court of Common Pleas
- The Ramsey (Cambridgeshire) Court of Pleas
- The Ripon Court Military
- The Ripon Dean and Chapter's Canon Fee Court
- The St. Albans Court of Requests
- The Court of the Hundred, Manor and Borough of Tiverton
- The York Court of Husting
- The York Court of Guildhall
- The York Court of Conservancy
- The Ancient Prescriptive Court of Wells
- The Cheyney Court of the Bishop of Winchester.

University courts were limited in jurisdiction to matters relating to the statutes of the university in question:

- Court of the Chancellor or Vice-Chancellor of Oxford University
- The Cambridge University Chancellor's Court

The Court of Minstrels in Tutbury, Staffordshire was ordered to close by the Duke of Devonshire in 1778

=== Hundred and manorial courts ===
These included courts leet.

=== Forest courts ===
By 1909, the Court of Regard had been obsolete for centuries. Swainmotes were still held, but were mere formalities. No Court of Justice Seat had been held since 1662, and it could be regarded as obsolete.

=== Courts of the Cinque Ports ===
The Cinque Ports had a Court of Chancery and a Court of Load Manage for the regulation of pilots until the Cinque Ports Act 1855.

=== Palatine courts ===
==== Durham and Sadberge ====
The Court of Chancery of the County Palatine of Durham and Sadberge was merged into the High Court by the Courts Act 1971. The Court of Pleas of the County Palatine of Durham and Sadberge was merged into the High Court by the Supreme Court of Judicature Act 1873. The Court of the County of Durham was abolished by section 2 of the Durham (County Palatine) Act 1836.

==== Lancaster ====
The Court of Common Pleas of the County Palatine of Lancaster and the Court of Chancery of the County Palatine of Lancaster were merged into the High Court. The Court of Appeal in Chancery of the County Palatine of Lancaster was merged into the Court of Appeal.

==== Chester ====
Courts of the county palatine of Chester included the Exchequer of Chester, the County Court of Chester and the Pentice Court of the city of Chester.

The Courts of Session of the County Palatine of Chester and the Principality of Wales were abolished section 14 of by the Law Terms Act 1830.

==== Stannaries ====
The Stannaries Court was abolished by the Stannaries Court (Abolition) Act 1896.

== Other courts ==
- Lawless Court
- Court of Arraye
- Board of Green Cloth
- Marshalsea Court
- Restrictive Practices Court
