= Husting =

Small political assembly

A husting originally referred to a native Germanic governing assembly, the thing. By metonymy, the term may now refer to any event (such as debates or speeches) during an election campaign where one or more of the candidates are present.

== Development of the term ==
The origin of the term comes from the Old English hūsting and Old Norse hūsþing (literally "house thing"), an assembly of the followers or household retainers of a nobleman, such as a king, earl or chief. According to the Encyclopædia Britannica Eleventh Edition, the husting contrasted with the folkmoot, which was the assembly of the entire people.

The use of husting to mean a "temporary platform for political speeches" had developed by the year 1719, as an extension of the meaning of the Court of Husting, which was held at a platform at the Guildhall in the City of London, and presided over by the lord mayor, sheriff, and aldermen.

By the middle of the 19th century, the term hustings came to refer to the election campaigning process.

== 18th and 19th century practice ==
=== Britain ===
In Britain, a similar practice prevailed in elections to the House of Commons. At the conclusion of candidates' speeches, a show of hands was taken. This was an informal indication of the opinion of the voters and no official record was kept of how many voted for a particular candidate. Sometimes a candidate who found he had little support or otherwise did not want to continue declined to call for a poll. One example of this was seen in the 1784 election for the four seats of the City of London. William Pitt the Younger was proposed and "was returned on the show of hands" but removed himself from consideration before the polling was completed. Hustings crowds were often boisterous and unruly.

An individual parliamentary constituency might have several separate hustings. Initially, many constituencies had only a single hustings as the polling place, but the Reform Act 1832 required that a separate hustings exist for every 600 electors. The 1832 act also slightly extended the franchise, expanding the percentage of the population eligible to vote from about 5% to 7%, and furthering the notions of representation. Although ineligible to vote, historians have noted that women and unenfranchised men took part in "looking on"—the "active participation of non-electors in the rituals of the nomination and the hustings."

The Ballot Act 1872 abolished the hustings in Britain in favor of the secret ballot. The system of public nomination at the hustings was replaced by nomination based on the submissions of signed papers. John Bright, a Radical reformer, was among those who supported the secret ballot and the end to the hustings, citing the "tumult and disorder" (including often alcohol-fueled mob violence that accompanied the hustings process in some areas). Proponents of the abolition of the public hustings also argued that the increased literacy rate and the availability of inexpensive newspapers rendered the hustings superfluous.

=== Canada ===
In the Province of Canada, prior to Confederation, the returning officer (under an 1849 act) typically administered elections from the hustings. "Nomination day" and "declaration day" were separate. The returning officer took nominations by a show of hands to determine if any candidate received a majority; if a losing candidate demanded a vote, this was followed by several days of polling, then a return to the hustings where the returning officer declared the winner. (The polling period was originally six days, but this was reduced to two days with the 1842 and 1849 Election Acts). The show of hands and hustings declaration were abolished in 1866, and hustings nominations were abolished in federal elections by a federal statute in 1874. Historian George Neil Emery writes that after this point, "only in provincial elections did the hustings retain its original meaning: an elevated platform at the place of election from which the returning officer, candidates, and nominators of candidate addressed an assembled of electors before then."

=== Virginia ===
In Virginia, the Corporation or Hustings Courts were formerly lower-level state courts. However, a reorganization of state courts that took effect on July 1, 1973, abolished these and other courts, replacing them with a streamlined Virginia Circuit Court system.

== Modern usage ==
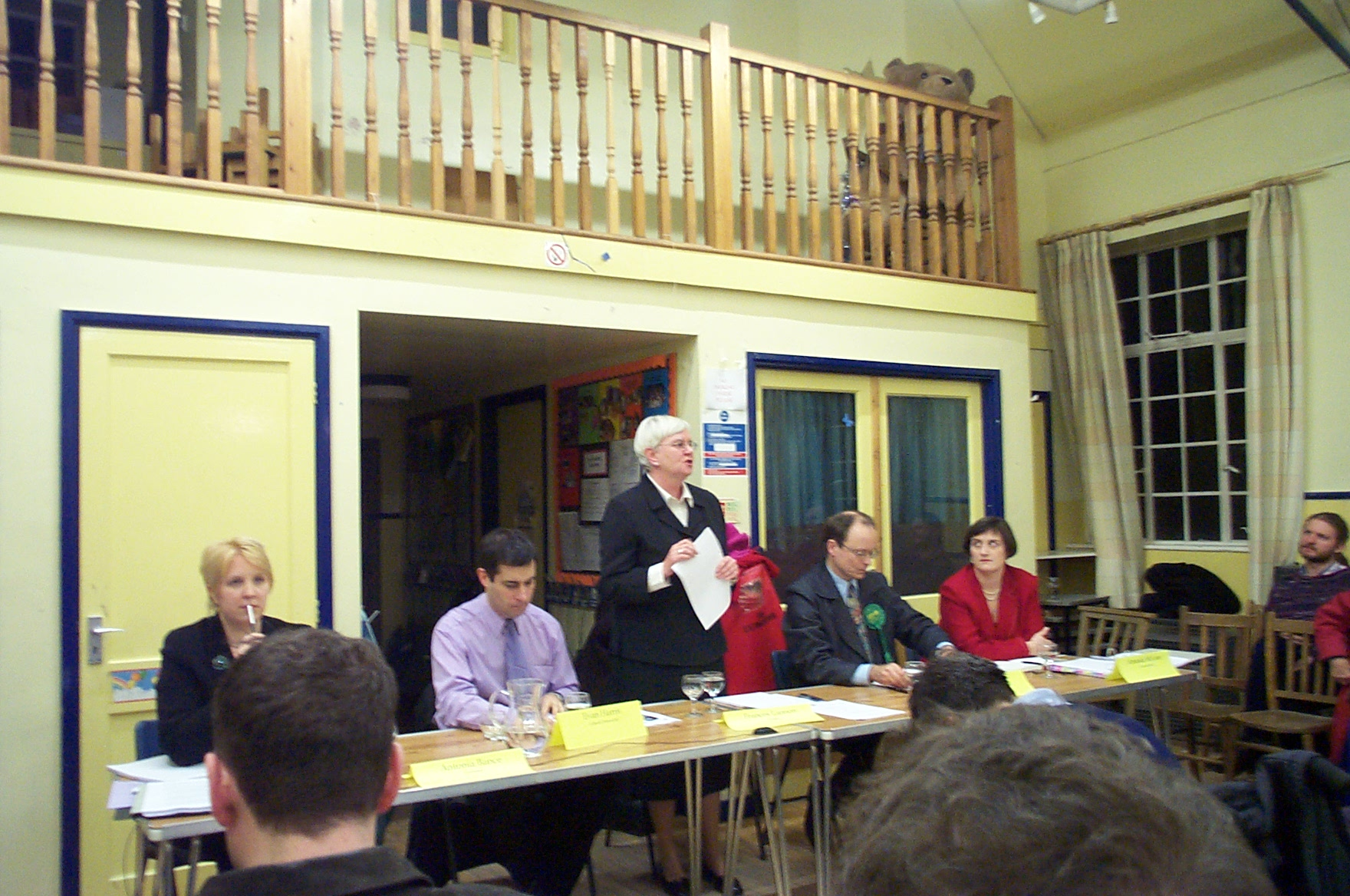
An election hustings in the Oxford West and Abingdon constituency, England during the 2005 United Kingdom general election

The plural term (e.g., "on the hustings") is used to mean the campaign trail in current Canadian and British usage.

== See also ==
- Mass meeting
- Town meeting
- Stump speech
