= Royal Commission on the City of London =

The Royal Commission on the Corporation of the City of London was a royal commission, established in 1853, which considered the local government arrangements of the City of London and the surrounding metropolitan area.

Three commissioners were appointed by letters patent under the Great Seal on 20 June 1853, to enquire into the existing state of the Corporation of the city of London. The commissioners were Henry Labouchere, Sir John Patteson and George Cornewall Lewis. The secretary was J. D. Coleridge The commission's report was sent to the Home Office on 28 April 1854.

== Report ==
The commission's report ([1772] HC (1854) xxvi) made thirty-two recommendations (with the implementation of the proposals or effect if any in parentheses):

1. A governing charter be granted to the City of London. The city had no charter as such, being regulated by an inspeximus of Charles II which recited previous charters without detailing them. Consequently, there was uncertainty to the exact rights, powers and privileges of the corporation. (Not effected, left as was to date but the corporation has sought parliamentary sanction to alter certain constitutional matters as a local authority.)
2. The method of election of the Lord Mayor should be altered to conform with the Municipal Corporations Act 1835. (This would mean that the election was by the Court of Common Council. Remains as privilege of the Liverymen as to date.)
3. The method of electing aldermen should be reformed: each alderman should be elected for a six-year term by the burgesses, with one alderman elected in each ward. (Remained elected for life, then until aged 70 until 1992, as per Lord Chancellor's advice on retirement of JPs, and elected for six year terms from 2004.) As in municipal boroughs, aldermen would be ex officio justices of the peace. (Ex officio JPs until 2004 when they had to qualify separately as JPs.)
4. Stipendiary magistrates for the city should be appointed in a similar way to the rest of England. (A stipendiary was appointed to support and advise the Aldermen and 'lay' i.e. non-aldermanic voluntary JPs were appointed by the corporation to support them.)
5. The Court of Aldermen should be abolished, with its powers transferred to the Common Council. (Remains as part of the Court of Common Council but has duties in respect to the Livery and candidacy to Aldermanic Sheriff and Lord Mayor.)
6. The number of wards of the city should be reduced, to between 12 and 16. The new wards would be of broadly similar area and population, with boundaries fixed by local inquiry. (Never implemented with respect to the 25 Wards of the city. The 26th Ward 'Bridge Without' was abolished by the Corporation in 1978, there being no electorate, only an appointed Alderman.)
7. The size of the Common Council would be reduced, and it would absorb the Court of Aldermen. The new Common Council would have three common councilmen and one alderman for each ward. (Never implemented; at the time there were over 200 Councilmen. Common Councillors reduced to 100 in 2004, but annual election replaced by four year terms.)
8. The electors for council elections should be all occupiers with a rateable value of 10 shillings or more, with no additional qualification. (Implemented by the corporation by automatically making all such tenure holders Freemen of the city.)
9. Elections in "Common Hall" should be abolished: this would end the influence of the livery companies on the corporation. (Never implemented for elections of ceremonial officers, Bridge Masters, Auditors, Ale Conners, Sheriffs and Lord Mayor; the Chamberlain, the Remembrancer and the Town Clerk became appointments of the Corporation directly in the late 1980s, even before then the 'election' was a formality of one candidate.)
10. The common council should continue to elect two sheriffs for the county of Middlesex. (Privilege abolished in 1889 with creation of Middlesex County Council's High Sheriff but the City Sheriffs were henceforth designated as 'for the City and for Middlesex'.)
11. The Lord Mayor's court and Sheriff's Court should be consolidated. (This was implemented by the corporation; they were both civil courts and under the city's overall jurisdiction anyway, housed in buildings neighbouring each other.)
12. The Court of Hustings should be abolished. (Essentially for enrolling of wills and similar formal documents so that other legislation substituted alternative procedures. Never implemented and specifically retained under the Administration of Justice Act 1977 as a ceremonial jurisdiction.)
13. The Court of St Martin's-le-Grand should be abolished. (Implemented as long in non-operation.)
14. The prohibition on anyone not a freeman of London to carry on a trade or handicraft in the city should be lifted. (Effected by the city by granting automatic entitlement of the Freedom to bona fide traders of the city as ipso facto ten shilling tenancy holders.)
15. The corporation should no longer be entitled to "metage" or duty on all fruit, grain and "measurable goods" landed on either side of the River Thames from Staines to Yantlet creek in Kent. (Privileges abolished in 1868 but duty still levied to support construction and maintenance of Thames Bridges above Blackfriars to Staines.)
16. The Fellowship of Porters should be dissolved. (Technically not a City body so that its abolition did not affect its interests.)
17. Brokers should not be admitted as aldermen. (No disqualifications of Aldermen under this rule were implemented.)
18. All street tolls on carts entering or leaving the city should be abolished. (There were few such duties. In effect the same issue as the Coal Duty and Wine duty and was effected in 1868 when duties were distributed across the Metropolis primarily for bridges and other public works.)
19. The City of London and Metropolitan Police Forces should be amalgamated. (Never implemented to date.)
20. The Conservancy of the Thames should be transferred from the corporation to a new Thames Navigation Board consisting of the Lord Mayor, First Lord of the Admiralty, President of the Board of Trade, First Commissioner of Woods and the Deputy Master of Trinity House. (Implemented only by transfer of authority to the Port of London Authority but the City still, to date, remains the Port Health Authority.)
21. The exclusive privileges of the Company of Watermen and Lightermen on the Thames should be abolished. (Training and apprenticeship remains with the company but the last vestige of it as a licensing authority was removed in 2009, its representatives are co-opted onto the necessary licensing bodies.)
22. The corporation's accounts should be consolidated, as there was "an unnecessary complexity in the keeping of the city accounts and in the administration of its affairs is produced by the multiplication of departments and separate funds." (Largely ignored but the Corporation tidied up its procedures with the assistance of the Courts using cy-près orders.)
23. The money and securities of the corporation should be lodged in the Bank of England. (Never implemented, the Chamberlain is in effect a 'bank'; cheques and money orders are presented to his department in the same way as a clearing bank.)
24. Auditors should be appointed in a manner consistent with Municipal Corporations Act 1835. (Professional auditors were henceforth elected by Common Hall, rather than laymen/Liverymen.)
25. The provisions of the 1835 legislation in relation to mortgages on land and to making annual returns should be extended to the city. (Adopted by the city as a procedure in any event.)
26. The Honourable The Irish Society should be dissolved, and its properties administered as a trust established by parliament, with trustees appointed by the Lord Chancellor of Ireland. (Never implemented to date, the HIS is in effect a Committee of the Common Council.)
27. The boundaries of the City of London should not be altered, but its control over the Borough of Southwark should be ended. (Never implemented as such, the practical administration and legal jurisdictions of the City in Southwark through its manorial courts leet had been displaced by local civil parishes vestry boards, poor law guardians and other statutory bodies and the Metropolitan Police magistrates courts and of Surrey at that date. The last vestiges were removed by the creation of the local boards of works, the Metropolitan Board of Works and finally the London County Council's Metropolitan Borough of Southwark in 1900.)
28. The remainder of the metropolis should be divided into districts for municipal purposes. The boundaries of the districts should correspond with the seven metropolitan parliamentary boroughs: Finsbury, Greenwich, Lambeth, Marylebone, Southwark, Tower Hamlets and Westminster. The districts would be governed by a "municipal body". (Not implemented in respect of the city's parliamentary representation until it was merged by Representation of the People Act 1948 and the City merged into the Westminster constituency. The other provisions had no effect on the city.)
29. A Metropolitan Board of Works should be established consisting of a number of members deputed from the "municipal bodies" and the Common Council. (Never implemented, the City did not participate in the arrangements but it did financially support and/or supplement these, e.g. Tower Bridge and major road works, in relation to improvements outside the City boundaries.)
30. The coal duties of the Corporation of London should be transferred to the Metropolitan Board. (Effected in 1868.)
31. The Metropolitan Board should be empowered to levy a rate for public works of "general metropolitan utility". (The Corporation contributed without representation.)
32. No works should be performed by the Metropolitan Board without the sanction of the Privy Council. (No effect on the corporation's status.)

The findings of the report led to the creation of the Metropolitan Board of Works by the Metropolis Management Act 1855. The call to create municipal boroughs based on parliamentary representation was rejected. The City did not become part of the Metropolitan Board of Works arrangements but did support it financially. Not a single proposal was imposed on the corporation and some minor suggestions were adopted by the City voluntarily and no legislation was enacted which effected any of the proposals which could have directly affected the city's interests.
