= List of statutory rules of Northern Ireland, 2014 =

This is a list of statutory rules made in the Northern Ireland in 2014.

== 1-100 ==
Number	Title
1	The Common Agricultural Policy Single Payment and Support Schemes (Cross Compliance) (Amendment) Regulations (Northern Ireland) 2014
2	The General Ophthalmic Services (Amendment) Regulations (Northern Ireland) 2014
3	The General Dental Services (Amendment) Regulations (Northern Ireland) 2014
4	The Waiting Restrictions (Ballykelly) Order (Northern Ireland) 2014
5	The Loading Bays and Parking Places on Roads (Amendment) Order (Northern Ireland) 2014
6	The Dissert Road, Draperstown (Abandonment) Order (Northern Ireland) 2014
7	The Parking Places on Roads (Electric Vehicles) (Amendment) Order (Northern Ireland) 2014
8	The Green Road, Conlig (Abandonment) Order (Northern Ireland) 2014
9	The Landlord Registration Scheme Regulations (Northern Ireland) 2014
10	The Deregulation (Improvement of Enforcement Procedures) (Food Safety) (Revocation) Order (Northern Ireland) 2014
11	The Infant Formula and Follow-on Formula (Amendment) Regulations (Northern Ireland) 2014 (revoked)
12	The Magistrates’ Courts (Amendment) Rules (Northern Ireland) 2014
13	The Waiting Restrictions (Dungannon) (Amendment) Order (Northern Ireland) 2014
14	The Slieveboy Road, Claudy (Abandonment) Order (Northern Ireland) 2014
15	Salmon Netting Regulations (Northern Ireland) 2014
16	Salmon Drift Net Regulations (Northern Ireland) 2014
17	Fisheries Regulations (Northern Ireland) 2014
18 (C. 1)	The Charities (2008 Act) (Commencement No. 5) Order (Northern Ireland) 2014
19	Police Service of Northern Ireland and Police Service of Northern Ireland Reserve pensions (Amendment) Regulations 2014
20	The Misuse of Drugs (Designation) (Amendment) Order (Northern Ireland) 2014
21	The Misuse of Drugs (Amendment) Regulations (Northern Ireland) 2014
22	The Rates (Regional Rates) Order (Northern Ireland) 2014
23	The Gangmasters Licensing (Exclusions) Regulations (Northern Ireland) 2014
24	The Parking Places and Loading Bays on Roads (Glengall Street, Belfast) (Amendment) Order (Northern Ireland) 2014
25	The Parking Places (Disabled Persons’ Vehicles) (Amendment) Order (Northern Ireland) 2014
26	The Explosives (Hazard Information and Packaging for Supply) (Amendment) Regulations (Northern Ireland) 2014 (revoked)
27	The Rehabilitation of Offenders (Exceptions) (Amendment) Order (Northern Ireland) 2014
28	The Police Act 1997 (Criminal Records) (Amendment) Regulations (Northern Ireland) 2014
29	The Waiting Restrictions (Carrickfergus) Order (Northern Ireland) 2014
30	The Parking and Waiting Restrictions (Portrush) (Amendment) Order (Northern Ireland) 2014
31	The Planning (General Development) (Amendment) Order (Northern Ireland) 2014 (revoked)
32	The Former Glenshane Road at Ranaghan Bridge, Magherafelt (Abandonment) Order (Northern Ireland) 2014
33	The Social Security (Crediting and Treatment of Contributions, and National Insurance Numbers) (Amendment) Regulations (Northern Ireland) 2014
34	The Control of Traffic (Bridge Street, Lisburn) Order (Northern Ireland) 2014
35	The Parking Places on Roads (Bridge Street, Lisburn) Order (Northern Ireland) 2014
36	The M1/Trunk Road T3 and M1-M2 Link (Amendment) Order (Northern Ireland) 2014
37	The Teachers’ Superannuation (Amendment) Regulations (Northern Ireland) 2014
38	The Waiting Restrictions (Markethill) (Revocation) Order (Northern Ireland) 2014
39	The Employment Rights (Increase of Limits) Order (Northern Ireland) 2014 (revoked)
40	The Building Society Special Administration Rules (Northern Ireland) 2014
41	The Building Society Insolvency Rules (Northern Ireland) 2014
42	The Parking Places on Roads (Electric Vehicles) (Amendment No. 2) Order (Northern Ireland) 2014
43	The Energy Performance of Buildings (Certificates and Inspections) (Amendment) Regulations (Northern Ireland) 2014
44	The Building (Amendment) Regulations (Northern Ireland) 2014
45	The Rail Vehicle Accessibility Regulations (Northern Ireland) 2014
46	The Rail Vehicle Accessibility (Applications for Exemption Orders) Regulations (Northern Ireland) 2014
47	The Explosives (Hazard Information and Packaging for Supply) (Amendment No. 2) Regulations (Northern Ireland) 2014
48	The Public Interest Disclosure (Prescribed Persons) (Amendment) Order (Northern Ireland) 2014 (revoked)
49	The Social Security Revaluation of Earnings Factors Order (Northern Ireland) 2014
50	The Social Security Pensions (Low Earnings Threshold) Order (Northern Ireland) 2014
51	The Social Security Pensions (Flat Rate Accrual Amount) Order (Northern Ireland) 2014
52	The Domestic Energy Efficiency Grants (Amendment) Regulations (Northern Ireland) 2014
53 (C. 2)	The Criminal Justice (2013 Act) (Commencement No. 3) Order (Northern Ireland) 2014
54	The Importation of Animals (Amendment) Order (Northern Ireland) 2014
55	The Salaries (Assembly Ombudsman and Commissioner for Complaints) Order (Northern Ireland) 2014 (revoked)
56	The Firefighters’ Pension Scheme (Amendment) Order (Northern Ireland) 2014
57	The New Firefighters’ Pension Scheme (Amendment) Order (Northern Ireland) 2014
58	The Zoonoses (Fees) (Amendment) Regulations (Northern Ireland) 2014
59	The Health and Personal Social Services (Superannuation), Health and Social Care (Pension Scheme) (Amendment) Regulations (Northern Ireland) 2014
60	The Gas (Individual Standards of Performance) Regulations (Northern Ireland) 2014
61	The Pension Protection Fund and Occupational Pension Schemes (Levy Ceiling and Compensation Cap) Order (Northern Ireland) 2014
62	The Pneumoconiosis, etc., (Workers’ Compensation) (Payment of Claims) (Amendment) Regulations (Northern Ireland) 2014
63	The Mesothelioma Lump Sum Payments (Conditions and Amounts) (Amendment) Regulations (Northern Ireland) 2014
64	The Legal Aid (General) (Amendment) Regulations (Northern Ireland) 2014
65	The Statutory Sick Pay (Maintenance of Records) (Revocation) Regulations (Northern Ireland) 2014
66	The Common Agricultural Policy Single Payment and Support Schemes (Amendment) Regulations (Northern Ireland) 2014
67	The Valuation (Telecommunications, Natural Gas and Water) (Amendment) Regulations (Northern Ireland) 2014
68	The Rates (Small Business Hereditament Relief) (Amendment) Regulations (Northern Ireland) 2014
69	The Rates (Unoccupied Hereditaments) (Amendment) Regulations (Northern Ireland) 2014
70	The Teachers' Superannuation (Amendment) (No. 2) Regulations (Northern Ireland) 2014 (revoked)
71	The General Register Office (Fees) Order (Northern Ireland) 2014 (revoked)
72	The Parking Places, Loading Bay and Waiting Restrictions (Newcastle) Order (Northern Ireland) 2014
73	The Social Security (Claims and Payments) (Amendment) Regulations (Northern Ireland) 2014 (revoked)
74	The Control of Major Accident Hazards (Amendment) Regulations (Northern Ireland) 2014
75	The Guaranteed Minimum Pensions Increase Order (Northern Ireland) 2014
76 (C. 3)	The Pensions (2008 No. 2 Act) (Commencement No. 11) Order (Northern Ireland) 2014
77	The Fluorinated Greenhouse Gases (Amendment) Regulations (Northern Ireland) 2014 (revoked)
78	The Social Security Benefits Up-rating Order (Northern Ireland) 2014 (revoked)
79	The Occupational and Personal Pension Schemes (Disclosure of Information) Regulations (Northern Ireland) 2014
80	The Social Security Benefits Up-rating Regulations (Northern Ireland) 2014
81	The Automatic Enrolment (Earnings Trigger and Qualifying Earnings Band) Order (Northern Ireland) 2014
82	The Annesborough Road, Lurgan (Abandonment) Order (Northern Ireland) 2014
83	The Parking Places on Roads (Londonderry) (Amendment) Order (Northern Ireland) 2014
84	The One-Way Traffic (Portrush) (Amendment) Order (Northern Ireland) 2014
85	The Roads (Speed Limit) Order (Northern Ireland) 2014
86	The Agriculture (Student fees)(Amendment) Regulations (Northern Ireland) 2014 (revoked)
87	The Education (Student Loans) (Repayment) (Amendment) Regulations (Northern Ireland) 2014
88	The Employment Relations (Northern Ireland) Order 1999 (Blacklists) Regulations (Northern Ireland) 2014
89	The Occupational and Personal Pension Schemes (Automatic Enrolment) (Amendment) Regulations (Northern Ireland) 2014
90	The Parking and Waiting Restrictions (Strabane) (Amendment) Order (Northern Ireland) 2014
91	The Trewmount Close, Killyman, Dungannon (Abandonment) Order (Northern Ireland) 2014
92	The Single Common Market Organisation (Consequential Amendments) Regulations (Northern Ireland) 2014
93	The Occupational Pension Schemes (Miscellaneous Amendments) Regulations (Northern Ireland) 2014
94	The Road Races (Croft Hill Climb) Order (Northern Ireland) 2014
95	The Road Races (Circuit of Ireland Rally) Order (Northern Ireland) 2014
96	The Sea Fishing (Financial Assistance to Fishing Boats) Scheme Regulations (Northern Ireland) 2014
97	The Education (Student Support) (No. 2) Regulations (Northern Ireland) 2009 (Amendment) Regulations (Northern Ireland) 2014
98	The Housing Benefit (Habitual Residence) (Amendment) Regulations (Northern Ireland) 2014
99	The Pensions Increase (Review) Order (Northern Ireland) 2014
100	The Police Act 1997 (Criminal Record Certificates: Relevant Matters) (Amendment) Order (Northern Ireland) 2014

== 101-200 ==
Number	Title
101	The Registered Rents (Increase) Order (Northern Ireland) 2014
102	The Social Security (Maternity Allowance) (Participating Wife or Civil Partner of Self-employed Earner) Regulations (Northern Ireland) 2014
103	The Secure Tenancies (Notice) Regulations (Northern Ireland) 2014
104	The Road Races (Cookstown 100) Order (Northern Ireland) 2014
105	The Social Security (Miscellaneous Amendments) Regulations (Northern Ireland) 2014
106	The Parking Places (Disabled Persons’ Vehicles) (Amendment No. 2) Order (Northern Ireland) 2014
107	The Welfare of Animals at the Time of Killing Regulations (Northern Ireland) 2014
108	The Recovery of Health Service Charges (Amounts) (Amendment) Regulations (Northern Ireland) 2014
109	The Road Races (Tandragee 100) Order (Northern Ireland) 2014
110	The Whole of Government Accounts (Designation of Bodies) Order (Northern Ireland) 2014
111	The Safeguarding Board for Northern Ireland (Membership, Procedure, Functions and Committee) (Amendment) Regulations (Northern Ireland) 2014
112	The North Circular Road and Tarry Lane, Lurgan (Abandonment) Order (Northern Ireland) 2014
113	The Parking and Waiting Restrictions (Charlemont Gardens, Armagh) Order (Northern Ireland) 2014
114	The Waiting Restrictions (Larne) (Amendment) Order (Northern Ireland) 2014
115	The Waiting Restrictions (Londonderry) (Amendment) Order (Northern Ireland) 2014
116	The Student Fees (Amounts) (Amendment) Regulations (Northern Ireland) 2014 (revoked)
117	The Controlled Waste and Duty of Care (Amendment) Regulations (Northern Ireland) 2014
118	The Planning (Control of Advertisements) (Amendment) Regulations (Northern Ireland) 2014
119	The Road Races (Tour of the Sperrins Rally) Order (Northern Ireland) 2014
120	The Road Races (North West 200) Order (Northern Ireland) 2014
121	The Social Security (Invalid Care Allowance) (Amendment) Regulations (Northern Ireland) 2014 (revoked)
122	The Road Races (Drumhorc Hill Climb) Order (Northern Ireland) 2014
123 (C. 4)	The Public Service Pensions (2014 Act) (Commencement No.1) Order (Northern Ireland) 2014
124	The Westlink (Busways) (Amendment) Regulations (Northern Ireland) 2014
125 (C. 5)	The Tobacco Retailers (2014 Act) (Commencement No. 1) Order (Northern Ireland) 2014
126	The Council of the Pharmaceutical Society of Northern Ireland (Indemnity Arrangements) Regulations (Northern Ireland) 2014 (revoked)
127	The Planning (Fees) (Amendment) Regulations (Northern Ireland) 2014 (revoked)
128	The Bus Lanes (Dublin Road, Antrim) Order (Northern Ireland) 2014
129	The Waiting Restrictions (Carrickfergus) (Amendment) Order (Northern Ireland) 2014
130	The Road Races (Spamount Hill Climb) Order (Northern Ireland) 2014
131	The Attorney General's Human Rights Guidance (Public Prosecution Service for Northern Ireland) Order (Northern Ireland) 2014
132	The Attorney General's Human Rights Guidance (Northern Ireland Prison Service – Conditions of Imprisonment) Order (Northern Ireland) 2014
133	The Social Security (Habitual Residence) (Amendment) Regulations (Northern Ireland) 2014
134	The Police and Criminal Evidence (1989 Order) (Codes of Practice) (Revision of Codes C and H) Order (Northern Ireland) 2014
135	The Nicholsons Court, Newry (Abandonment) Order (Northern Ireland) 2014
136	The Rowantree Road (C355), Dromore (Abandonment) Order (Northern Ireland) 2014
137	The Waste Management Licensing (Amendment) Regulations (Northern Ireland) 2014
138 (C. 6)	The Child Support, Pensions and Social Security (2000 Act) (Commencement No. 12) Order (Northern Ireland) 2014
139	The Land Registry (Fees) Order (Northern Ireland) 2014
140	The Social Security (Maternity Allowance) (Miscellaneous Amendments) Regulations (Northern Ireland) 2014
141	The B162 Dissert Road, Draperstown (Abandonment) Order (Northern Ireland) 2014
142 (C. 7)	The Local Government (2014 Act) (Commencement No. 1) Order (Northern Ireland) 2014
143	The Business Improvement Districts (General) Regulations (Northern Ireland) 2014
144	The Waiting Restrictions (Banbridge) Order (Northern Ireland) 2014
145	The U232 Aghafad Road (Rubble Road), Newtownstewart (Abandonment) Order (Northern Ireland) 2014
146	The Renewables Obligation (Amendment) Order (Northern Ireland) 2014
147	The Sulphur Content of Liquid Fuels (Amendment) Regulations (Northern Ireland) 2014
148	The Local Government (Transitional, Supplementary, Incidental Provisions and Modifications) Regulations (Northern Ireland) 2014
149	The Road Races (Cairncastle Hill Climb) Order (Northern Ireland) 2014
150	The Jobseeker's Allowance (Schemes for Assisting Persons to Obtain Employment) Regulations (Northern Ireland) 2014
151	The Foot and Mouth Disease (Amendment) Regulations (Northern Ireland) 2014
152	The Attorney General's Human Rights Guidance (Northern Ireland Prison Service – Prison Order and Discipline) Order (Northern Ireland) 2014
153 (C. 8)	The Local Government (2014 Act) (Commencement No. 2) Order (Northern Ireland) 2014
154	The Optical Charges and Payments (Amendment) Regulations (Northern Ireland) 2014
155 (C. 9)	The Financial Provisions (2014 Act) (Commencement No.1) Order (Northern Ireland) 2014
156	The Social Security (Reciprocal Agreements) Order (Northern Ireland) 2014
157	The Road Races (Dungannon Bush Motorcycle Race) Order (Northern Ireland) 2014
158	The Misuse of Drugs (Amendment No.2) and Misuse of Drugs (Safe Custody) (Amendment) Regulations (Northern Ireland) 2014
159	The Misuse of Drugs (Designation) (Amendment No.2) Order (Northern Ireland) 2014
160	The Waiting Restrictions (Randalstown) (Amendment) Order (Northern Ireland) 2014
161	The Parking and Waiting Restrictions (Cathedral Quarter, Belfast) Order (Northern Ireland) 2014
162	The Social Security (Recovery of Benefits) (Lump Sum Payments) (Amendment) Regulations (Northern Ireland) 2014
163	The Police Rehabilitation and Retraining Trust Regulations (Northern Ireland) 2014
164	The Cycle Routes (Amendment) Order (Northern Ireland) 2014
165	The Waiting Restrictions (Antrim) Order (Northern Ireland) 2014
166	The Smoke Control Areas (Exempted Fireplaces) (Amendment) Regulations (Northern Ireland) 2014
167	The Child Support (Great Britain Reciprocal Arrangements) (Amendment) Regulations (Northern Ireland) 2014
168	The New Firefighters’ Pension Scheme (Amendment) (No. 2) Order (Northern Ireland) 2014
169	The Firefighters’ Pension Scheme (Amendment) (No. 2) Order (Northern Ireland) 2014
170	The Pharmaceutical Services (Amendment) Regulations (Northern Ireland) 2014
171	The Parking Places (Disabled Persons’ Vehicles) (Amendment No. 3) Order (Northern Ireland) 2014
172	The Plant Health (Amendment) Order (Northern Ireland) 2014
173	The Industrial Training Levy (Construction Industry) Order (Northern Ireland) 2014
174	The Rehabilitation of Offenders (Exceptions) (Amendment) (No. 2) Order (Northern Ireland) 2014
175 (C. 10)	The Child Maintenance (2008 Act) (Commencement No. 13) Order (Northern Ireland) 2014
176	The Roads (Speed Limit) (No. 2) Order (Northern Ireland) 2014
177	The Motor Hackney Carriages (Newry) Bye-Laws (Amendment) Order (Northern Ireland) 2014
178	The Magistrates’ Courts and County Court Appeals (Criminal Legal Aid) (Costs) (Amendment) Rules (Northern Ireland) 2014
179 (C. 11) (C. 10)	The Criminal Justice (2013 Act) (Commencement No. 4) Order (Northern Ireland) 2014
180	The Bus and Coach Passengers Rights and Obligations (Designation and Enforcement) Regulations (Northern Ireland) 2014
181	The Police and Criminal Evidence (1989 Order) (Codes of Practice) (Temporary Modification to Code A) Order (Northern Ireland) 2014
182	The Child Support Fees Regulations (Northern Ireland) 2014
183 (C. 12)	The Pensions (2005 Order) (Commencement No. 15) Order (Northern Ireland) 2014
184	The Animal By-Products (Enforcement) (Amendment) Regulations (Northern Ireland) 2014 (revoked)
185	The Sexual Offences Act 2003 (Notification Requirements) Regulations (Northern Ireland) 2014
186	The Bus and Coach Passengers Rights and Obligations (Designation of Terminals, Tour Operators and Enforcement) Regulations (Northern Ireland) 2014
187	The Road Races (Eagles Rock Hill Climb) Order (Northern Ireland) 2014
188	The Local Government Pension Scheme Regulations (Northern Ireland) 2014
189	The Local Government Pension Scheme (Amendment and Transitional Provisions) Regulations (Northern Ireland) 2014
190	The Planning (Hazardous Substances) (Amendment) Regulations (Northern Ireland) 2014
191	The Child Support (Ending Liability in Existing Cases and Transition to New Calculation Rules) Regulations (Northern Ireland) 2014
192	The Jobseeker's Allowance (Homeless Claimants) (Amendment) Regulations (Northern Ireland) 2014
193	The Child Support (Modification, Consequential and Miscellaneous Amendments) Regulations (Northern Ireland) 2014
194 (C. 13)	The Child Maintenance (2008 Act) (Commencement No. 14 and Transitional Provisions) Order (Northern Ireland) 2014
195	The Pension Protection Fund (Entry Rules) (Amendment) Regulations (Northern Ireland) 2014
196	The Trade in Animals and Related Products (Amendment) Regulations (Northern Ireland) 2014
197	The Business Improvement Districts (Miscellaneous) Regulations (Northern Ireland) 2014
198	The Energy Efficiency Regulations (Northern Ireland) 2014
199	The U6007 Meadowlands, Downpatrick (Abandonment) Order (Northern Ireland) 2014
200	The Motor Hackney Carriages (Newcastle) Bye-Laws (Amendment) Order (Northern Ireland) 2014

=== 201-242 ===
Number	Title
201	The Lower Galliagh Road, Londonderry (Abandonment) Order (Northern Ireland) 2014
202	The Waste Electrical and Electronic Equipment (Charges) Regulations (Northern Ireland) 2014
203 (C. 14)	The Pensions (2012 Act) (Commencement No. 4) Order (Northern Ireland) 2014
204	The Pensions (2012 Act) (Transitional, Consequential and Supplementary Provisions) Regulations (Northern Ireland) 2014
205	The Road Races (Armoy Motorcycle Race) Order (Northern Ireland) 2014
206	The Road Passenger Transport (Qualifications of Operators) Regulations (Northern Ireland) 2014
207	The Police Act 1997 (Criminal Record Certificates: Relevant Matters) (Amendment No. 2) Order (Northern Ireland) 2014
208	The Groundwater (Amendment) Regulations (Northern Ireland) 2014
209	The Sea Fishing (Licences and Notices) Regulations (Northern Ireland) 2014
210	The Road Races (Craigantlet Hill Climb) Order (Northern Ireland) 2014
211	The Parking and Waiting Restrictions (Omagh) (Amendment) Order (Northern Ireland) 2014
212	The Road Races (Ulster Grand Prix Bike Week) Order (Northern Ireland) 2014
213	The Pensions (2012 Act) (Consequential and Supplementary Provisions) Regulations (Northern Ireland) 2014
214	The Road Races (Ulster Rally) Order (Northern Ireland) 2014
215	The Health and Personal Social Services (General Medical Services Contracts) (Prescription of Drugs Etc.) (Amendment) Regulations (Northern Ireland) 2014
216	The Motor Vehicles (Construction and Use) (Amendment) Regulations (Northern Ireland) 2014
217	The Road Races (Garron Point Hill Climb) Order (Northern Ireland) 2014
218	The General Teaching Council for Northern Ireland (Constitution) (Amendment) Regulations (Northern Ireland) 2014
219	The Crown Court (Amendment) Rules (Northern Ireland) 2014
220	The Rules of the Court of Judicature (Northern Ireland) (Amendment) 2014
221	The Magistrates’ Courts (Amendment No. 2) Rules (Northern Ireland) 2014
222	The Criminal Appeal (Amendment) (Northern Ireland) Rules 2014
223	The Food Information Regulations (Northern Ireland) 2014
224	The Control of Explosives Precursors etc. Regulations (Northern Ireland) 2014
225	The Health and Personal Social Services (Superannuation), Health and Social Care (Pension Scheme) (Amendment No.2) Regulations (Northern Ireland) 2014
226	The Jobseeker's Allowance (Maternity Allowance) (Amendment) Regulations (Northern Ireland) 2014
227	The Motor Vehicles (Construction and Use) (Amendment No. 2) Regulations (Northern Ireland) 2014
228	The Private Crossings (Signs and Barriers) Regulations (Northern Ireland) 2014
229	The Level Crossing (McConaghy's) Order (Northern Ireland) 2014
230	The Road Traffic Offenders (Additional Offences) Order (Northern Ireland) 2014
231	The Road Traffic (Fixed Penalty) (Offences) (Amendment) Order (Northern Ireland) 2014
232	The Road Traffic (Fixed Penalty) (Amendment) Order (Northern Ireland) 2014
233	The Road Traffic (Financial Penalty Deposit) (Amendment) Order (Northern Ireland) 2014
234	The Road Traffic (Financial Penalty Deposit) (Appropriate Amount) (Amendment) Order (Northern Ireland) 2014
235	The Social Security (Jobseeker's Allowance and Employment and Support Allowance) (Waiting Days) (Amendment) Regulations (Northern Ireland) 2014
236	The Prohibition of Waiting (Amendment) Order (Northern Ireland) 2014
237	The Parking Places (Disabled Persons’ Vehicles) (Amendment No. 4) Order (Northern Ireland) 2014
238 (C. 15)	The Taxis (2008 Act) (Commencement No. 3) Order (Northern Ireland) 2014
239	The Taxi Drivers’ Licences Regulations (Northern Ireland) 2014
240	The Parking Places on Roads (Electric Vehicles) (Amendment No. 3) Order (Northern Ireland) 2014
241	The Parking and Waiting Restrictions (Ballymoney) (Amendment) Order (Northern Ireland) 2014
242	The One-Way Traffic (Belfast) (Amendment) Order (Northern Ireland) 2014
243	The Control of Traffic (Belfast City Centre) Order (Northern Ireland) 2014
244	The Waiting Restrictions (Dungannon) (Amendment No. 2) Order (Northern Ireland) 2014
245	The Parking and Waiting Restrictions (Omagh) (Amendment No. 2) Order (Northern Ireland) 2014
246	The Parking Places (Disabled Persons’ Vehicles) (Amendment No. 5) Order (Northern Ireland) 2014
247	The One-Way Traffic (Banbridge) (Amendment) Order (Northern Ireland) 2014
248	The Parking and Waiting Restrictions (Magherafelt) (Amendment) Order (Northern Ireland) 2014
249	The Smoke Control Areas (Authorised Fuels) (Amendment) Regulations (Northern Ireland) 2014
250	The Waiting Restrictions (Cookstown) (Amendment) Order (Northern Ireland) 2014
251	The Waiting Restrictions (Belfast City Centre) (Amendment) Order (Northern Ireland) 2014
252	The Waiting Restrictions (Craigavon) Order (Northern Ireland) 2014
253	The Waste Management Licensing (Amendment No. 2) Regulations (Northern Ireland) 2014
254	The Road Races (Down Rally) Order (Northern Ireland) 2014
255	The Prohibition of Traffic (Giant's Causeway Road) Order (Northern Ireland) 2014
256	The Waiting Restrictions (Lurgan) (No. 2) Order (Amendment) Order (Northern Ireland) 2014
257	The A4 Sligo Road, Belcoo (Abandonment) Order (Northern Ireland) 2014
258	The Drumalla Park, Carnlough (Abandonment) Order (Northern Ireland) 2014
259	The Lands Tribunal (Salaries) Order (Northern Ireland) 2014
260	The Parking and Waiting Restrictions (Banbridge) Order (Northern Ireland) 2014
261	The Misuse of Drugs (Amendment No.3) Regulations (Northern Ireland) 2014
262	The Misuse of Drugs (Designation) (Amendment No.3) Order (Northern Ireland) 2014
263	The Jobseeker's Allowance (Habitual Residence) (Amendment) Regulations (Northern Ireland) 2014
264	The Local Government (Indemnities for Members and Officers) (Amendment) Order (Northern Ireland) 2014
265	The Police Act 1997 (Criminal Records) (Amendment No. 2) Regulations (Northern Ireland) 2014
266	The Brucellosis Control (Amendment) Order (Northern Ireland) 2014 (revoked)
267	The Health and Social Care (Disciplinary Procedures) Regulations (Northern Ireland) 2014 (revoked)
268	The A3 Portadown Road, Richhill (Abandonment) Order (Northern Ireland) 2014
269	The Waiting Restrictions (Larne) (Amendment) Order (Northern Ireland) 2014
270	The Waiting Restrictions (Lurgan) (No. 2) Order (Amendment No. 2) Order (Northern Ireland) 2014
271	The Roads (Classification) Order (Northern Ireland) 2014
272	The Latt Road, Jerrettspass, Newry (Abandonment) Order (Northern Ireland) 2014
273	The A21 Ballygowan Road, Saintfield (Abandonment) Order (Northern Ireland) 2014
274	The Attorney General's Human Rights Guidance (Northern Ireland Courts and Tribunals Service – Support for Victims and Witnesses) Order (Northern Ireland) 2014
275	The Social Security (Miscellaneous Amendments No. 2) Regulations (Northern Ireland) 2014
276	The Producer Responsibility Obligations (Packaging Waste) (Amendment) Regulations (Northern Ireland) 2014 (revoked)
277	The Food Hygiene (Amendment) Regulations (Northern Ireland) 2014
278	The Penalty Charges (Additional Contraventions) Regulations (Northern Ireland) 2014
279	The Penalty Charges (Prescribed Devices) Regulations (Northern Ireland) 2014
280	The Health and Safety (Fees) (Amendment) Regulations (Northern Ireland) 2014
281	The Parking and Waiting Restrictions (Fivemiletown) Order (Northern Ireland) 2014
282	The Parking Places on Roads (Lurgan) (Amendment) Order (Northern Ireland) 2014
283	The Dogs (Licensing and Identification) (Amendment) Regulations (Northern Ireland) 2014
284	The Guarantees of Origin of Electricity Produced from High-efficiency Cogeneration (Amendment) Regulations (Northern Ireland) 2014
285	The Products Containing Meat etc. Regulations (Northern Ireland) 2014
286	The Food Hygiene and Official Feed and Food Controls (Amendment) Regulations (Northern Ireland) 2014
287	The Fish Labelling (Amendment) Regulations (Northern Ireland) 2014
288	The Misuse of Drugs (Amendment No.4) Regulations (Northern Ireland) 2014
289	The Parking and Waiting Restrictions (Belfast) (Amendment) Order (Northern Ireland) 2014
290	The Public Service (Civil Servants and Others) Pensions Regulations (Northern Ireland) 2014
291	The Common Agricultural Policy Direct Payments and Support Schemes (Cross Compliance) Regulations (Northern Ireland) 2014
292	Local Government (Disqualification) (Prescribed Offices and Employments) Regulations (Northern Ireland) 2014
293	The Safeguarding Board for Northern Ireland (Membership, Procedure, Functions and Committee) (Amendment No. 2) Regulations (Northern Ireland) 2014
294	The Smoke Control Areas (Exempted Fireplaces) (Amendment No. 2) Regulations (Northern Ireland) 2014
295	The Seeds (Miscellaneous Amendments) Regulations (Northern Ireland) 2014 (revoked)
296	The Marriage (Amendment) Regulations (Northern Ireland) 2014
297	The Civil Partnership (Amendment) Regulations (Northern Ireland) 2014
298	The Occupational Pensions (Revaluation) Order (Northern Ireland) 2014
299	The Foyle Area (Complimentary Angling Permit) (River Finn and River Foyle) Regulations 2014
300 (C. 16)	The Taxis (2008 Act) (Commencement No.4) Order (Northern Ireland) 2014

== 301-324 ==
Number	Title
301	The Domestic Renewable Heat Incentive Scheme Regulations (Northern Ireland) 2014
302	The Taxi Licensing Regulations (Northern Ireland) 2014 (revoked)
303	The Taxi Operators Licensing (Amendment) Regulations (Northern Ireland) 2014 (revoked)
304	The Pollution Prevention and Control (Industrial Emissions) (Amendment) Regulations (Northern Ireland) 2014
305 (C. 17)	The Financial Provisions (2014 Act) (Commencement No. 2) Order (Northern Ireland) 2014
306 (C. 18)	The Rates (Amendment) (2009 Act) (Commencement No. 3) Order (Northern Ireland) 2014
307	The Nitrates Action Programme Regulations (Northern Ireland) 2014
308	The Phosphorus (Use in Agriculture) Regulations (Northern Ireland) 2014 (revoked)
309	The Education (Student Support) (No. 2) Regulations (Northern Ireland) 2009 (Amendment) (No.2) Regulations (Northern Ireland) 2014
310	The Teachers' Pension Scheme Regulations (Northern Ireland) 2014
311	The A29 Armagh Road, Moy (Abandonment) Order (Northern Ireland) 2014
312	The Broadway, Larne (Abandonment) Order (Northern Ireland) 2014
313	The Parking and Waiting Restrictions (Armagh) Order (Northern Ireland) 2014
314	The Templemore Avenue, Belfast (Footpath) (Abandonment) Order (Northern Ireland) 2014
315	The Parking Places (Disabled Persons’ Vehicles) (Amendment No. 6) Order (Northern Ireland) 2014
316	The Roads (Speed Limit) (No. 3) Order (Northern Ireland) 2014
317	The Waiting Restrictions (Carrickfergus) (Amendment No. 2) Order (Northern Ireland) 2014
318	The Health and Social Care Bodies (Membership) (Amendment) Regulations (Northern Ireland) 2014
319	The General Dental Services (Amendment No. 2) Regulations (Northern Ireland) 2014
320	The Criminal Justice (European Protection Order) (Northern Ireland) Regulations 2014 (revoked)
321	The Public Service Pensions (Record Keeping and Miscellaneous Amendments) Regulations (Northern Ireland) 2014
322	The Justice (Northern Ireland) Act 2002 (Amendment of section 46(1)) Order (Northern Ireland) 2014
323	The Human Medicines (Amendment) Regulations 2014
324	The Human Medicines (Amendment) (No. 2) Regulations 2014

== See also ==
- List of acts of the Northern Ireland Assembly from 2014
- List of acts of the Parliament of the United Kingdom from 2014
