= Court of Common Pleas =

A court of common pleas is a common kind of court structure found in various common law jurisdictions. The form originated with the Court of Common Pleas at Westminster, which was created to permit individuals to press civil grievances against one another that did not involve the King.

The courts of common pleas in England and Ireland were abolished in the 19th century. The only remaining courts retaining the name "court of common pleas" are therefore in the United States: the Courts of Common Pleas of Ohio, Pennsylvania, South Carolina, and Delaware. Of these, the first two are superior trial courts of general jurisdiction, the third is the civil division of the superior trial court of general jurisdiction, and the fourth is an inferior trial court of limited jurisdiction. In all cases, their scope is different from the original Court of Common Pleas at Westminster, as they all have jurisdiction to hear civil matters involving the government, and all but South Carolina's have jurisdiction over criminal matters.

== Extant courts ==
- Delaware Court of Common Pleas
- Ohio Courts of Common Pleas
- Pennsylvania Courts of Common Pleas
- South Carolina Court of Common Pleas

== Defunct courts ==
=== England ===
- Court of Common Pleas at Westminster
- Court of Common Pleas of the County Palatine of Durham
- Court of Common Pleas of the County Palatine of Lancaster

=== Ireland ===
- Court of Common Pleas (Ireland)

=== United States ===
- New York Court of Common Pleas
- New Jersey Court of Common Pleas
