= Court of Common Pleas of the County Palatine of Lancaster =

The Court of Common Pleas of the County Palatine of Lancaster, sometimes called the Common Pleas of or at Lancaster was a court of common pleas that exercised jurisdiction within the County Palatine of Lancaster until its jurisdiction was transferred to the High Court by the Supreme Court of Judicature Act 1873. It was a Superior Court of Record, exercising, within the limits of the County Palatine, a jurisdiction similar to that of the superior courts of common law at Westminster.

== Judges ==
The Judges of this Court were formerly limited to two in number, being always the two judges of the courts at Westminster who had chosen the Northern Circuit; but by section 24 of the statute 4 and 5 Will 4 c 62, the King was empowered "in right of his duchy and county palatine of Lancaster, from time to time to nominate and appoint all or any of the judges of the superior courts at Westminster, to be judges of this court: provided nevertheless, that the judges before whom the assizes for this county shall from time to time be held, and their respective officers, shall alone be entitled to the fees and emoluments heretofore received by the judges of the county palatine, and their officers." In pursuance of this Act, the King, by his letters patent, under the seal of the county palatine, dated 15 November 1834, constituted all the then judges of the courts of King's Bench, Common Pleas at Westminster, and Exchequer, judges of this court, reserving to the two judges of the preceding assizes, their fees and emoluments. And by another patent, dated 3 March 1835, the King appointed the then lately created judges of the courts at Westminster, Lord Alinger, and Sir J. T. Coleridge Knight, to be judges of this court.

Notwithstanding the above general appointment, the judges of this court before whom the Assizes are holden, were, as of 1836, as before, appointed by a separate commission, under the seal of the county palatine, which latter appointment was made whenever a change took place in the judges who went the Northern Circuit.

By such separate commission one of the judges was constituted Chief Justice, and the other Justice, of all manner of pleas within the county palatine. No alteration in the form of such commission took place in consequence of the statute 4 & 5 Will 4 c 62; and the order of the King for holding the assizes at Liverpool as well as Lancaster, expressly directed that no alteration would be necessary in such commission. As all actions tried here whether commenced in this court, or transmitted by Mittimus, were tried at bar, under the authority of such commission, there was no clause of nisi prius in the award of jury process; and the judges could not be assisted in the trial of civil causes by a sergeant, as in other counties.

The chief justice usually presided in the crown court, at the assizes; and in vacation, rules and summonses were generally returnable before, and orders made by, him. The other assize judge usually presided in the civil court; and, during the Northern Circuit, rules and summonses were generally returnable before, and orders made by, him. Writs were tested in the name of the chief justice; or, in case of vacancy of such office, in the name of one of the other judges of this court. The judges had no associate; and each of them appointed his own marshal.

== Officers ==
=== Prothonotary ===
There was one Prothonotary of this court, whose office was a patent office, in the gift of the crown, in right of the duchy of Lancaster. This officer united in his own person the functions of the several clerical officers of the superior courts at Westminster: thus, he signed all writs issuing from this court, and filed the same when returned. All rules (necessary in the conduct of a suit) whether to shew cause, or absolute in the first instance, or upon a judge's order, were drawn up by him. With him, appearances were entered, and special bails, declarations, pleadings, and other proceedings, filed. He filed writs for the removal of causes into this court; and, returned writs of error and certiorari, for the removal of proceedings therefrom. Minutes of writs, declarations, pleadings, and other proceedings, were made by him, in books kept at his office: and he had the custody of all documents relating to the proceedings of this court.

It was his business to nominate special juries; to make out writs of venire facias and habeas corpora for juries, as well for the trial of causes, depending in this court, as of those sent to be tried here, by mittimus; and in the latter he drew up the posteas, and transmitted the same to London. He also drew up and enrolled judgments and recognizances of bail; and made official copies of fines, recoveries, and proceedings in a suit. He taxed costs between party and party, and attorney and client; and computed what was due for principal and interest, on bills, notes, bonds, mortgages, etc. He took recognizances of bail, prepared commissions for taking the same, and decided (upon affidavits) as to the sufficiency, or insufficiency of bail, when objected to. There was, however, in cases of bail, a power of appeal from his decision to the judges of the court; but no instance had been known for many years up to 1836 of such an appeal having been made.

By the order of the King for holding the assizes at Liverpool as well as Lancaster, the Prothonotary or his deputy was required to attend the assizes at both those places. In court, he called the jury, read documentary evidence, and took minutes of the proceedings and decisions. He also administered the oaths of persons admitted attorneys, and entered such admissions on the roll. For a long series of years the duties of this office were discharged by a deputy, resident at Preston.

=== Sheriff ===
The executive officer of this court was the Sheriff, who was appointed yearly, by patent, under the seal of the county palatine. Such appointment generally took place in the month of February, and the proceeding thereon was somewhat different from that on the appointment of Sheriffs of counties not palatine; the Chancellor of the Duchy and not the judges, selecting three persons, whose names he submitted to the King, as Duke of Lancaster, and the first in the list was usually appointed. The Sheriff of Lancashire was an immediate officer of this court, and was therefore subject to its jurisdiction, and punishable for contempt. He was also considered an officer of the courts at Westminster, and amenable for disobeying the process of those courts. His own attorney was generally appointed under-sheriff; and if the under-sheriff does not reside at Preston, he deputed an agent there, to discharge the duties of the office; and the sheriff or his deputy was required to attend the assizes both at Lancaster and Liverpool. Bailiffs, or officers for the execution of process, were appointed in the principal towns of the county, and acted under written warrants from the sheriff, in whose office the writs were lodged: but when the sheriff was a party to the suit, this court directed its process to the coroners of the county; and if they were interested, to elisors, named by the prothonotary.

In order to prevent abuses in the execution of process, it was a rule of this court, that "if any sheriff, under sheriff, sheriff's clerk, bailiff of liberty, or other bailiff, shall wilfully delay the execution, or return of any process, or execution; or shall take or require any undue fees for the same; or shall give notice to the defendant, and there by the execution of any process or writ be prevented; or having levied money detain it in his hands, after the return of the writ, besides the ordinary course of amerciaments, an attachment, information, commitment, or fine, to be as the case requireth; and this as well in the case of a late sheriff, or other person before mentioned, as of them present in office." And in furtherance of this provision it was ordered, that "if any sheriff's officer shall, under any pretence whatever, take from a defendant, on the execution of any bailable process, a larger sum than is allowed by this court, the sheriff shall, by an order of this court, or one of the judges thereof, be compelled to refund to the defendant, the amount of any such overcharge, together with the costs of any application that may be made for that purpose; provided such application be made, during the time such sheriff remains in office, or within a month afterwards."

== Transfer of jurisdiction to the High Court ==
Section 16(9) of the Supreme Court of Judicature Act 1873 provided that "there shall be transferred to and vested in" the "High Court of Justice the jurisdiction which, at the commencement of this Act, was vested in, or capable of being exercised by" the Court of Common Pleas at Lancaster. This provision was repealed and replaced by section 18(2)(a)(v) of the Supreme Court of Judicature (Consolidation) Act 1925, which was to the same effect.

As to prothonotaries, district prothonotaries and other officers of the Court of Common Pleas, see section 78 of the Supreme Court of Judicature Act 1873.
