= List of acts of the Northern Ireland Assembly from 2014 =

This is a list of acts of the Northern Ireland Assembly passed in 2014. Acts of the Northern Ireland Assembly are enacted by the Northern Ireland Assembly, which has legislative authority over devolved matters in relation to Northern Ireland under the authority of the Northern Ireland Act 1998. Acts are cited by calendar year, in the same fashion as acts of Parliament of the United Kingdom. Each act passed in a respective year is given a chapter number (abbreviated "c.") denoted by Arabic numerals, and citations are usually followed by the suffix "(N.I.)" so as to prevent confusion with acts of Parliament of the United Kingdom.

12 acts of the Northern Ireland Assembly were passed in 2014.

indicates that an act has been transcribed on Wikisource, indicates that an act is available to view at legislation.gov.uk, and indicates the location of the original act in the Parliamentary Archives.

== Acts of the Northern Ireland Assembly ==
Short title	Citation	Royal assent
Long title
Road Races (Amendment) Act (Northern Ireland) 2014	2014 c. 1 (N.I.)	17 January 2014
An Act to amend the Road Races (Northern Ireland) Order 1986 (Note: Road Races (Northern Ireland) Order 1986 (SI 1986/1887)) to provide for contingency days to be specified in an order authorising the use of roads in connection with road races and for the substitution of a contingency day for a day specified in such an order.
Public Service Pensions Act (Northern Ireland) 2014	2014 c. 2 (N.I.)	11 March 2014
An Act to make provision for public service pension schemes; and for connected purposes.
Budget Act (Northern Ireland) 2014 (repealed)	2014 c. 3 (N.I.)	19 March 2014
An Act to authorise the issue out of the Consolidated Fund of certain sums for the service of the years ending 31st March 2014 and 2015; to appropriate those sums for specified purposes; to authorise the Department of Finance and Personnel to borrow on the credit of the appropriated sums; to authorise the use for the public service of certain resources for the years ending 31st March 2014 and 2015; and to revise the limits on the use of certain accruing resources in the year ending 31st March 2014. (Repealed by Northern Ireland Budget Act 2017 (c. 34 (N.I.)))
Tobacco Retailers Act (Northern Ireland) 2014	2014 c. 4 (N.I.)	25 March 2014
An Act to make provision for a register of tobacco retailers; to make provision for dealing with the persistent commission of tobacco offences; to amend the Health and Personal Social Services (Northern Ireland) Order 1978; (Note: Health and Personal Social Services (Northern Ireland) Order 1978 (SI 1978/1907)) to confer additional powers of enforcement in relation to offences under that Order and the Children and Young Persons (Protection from Tobacco) (Northern Ireland) Order 1991; (Note: Children and Young Persons (Protection from Tobacco) (Northern Ireland) Order 1991 (SI 1991/2872)) and for connected purposes.
Health and Social Care (Amendment) Act (Northern Ireland) 2014	2014 c. 5 (N.I.)	11 April 2014
An Act to amend the Health and Social Care (Reform) Act (Northern Ireland) 2009 (Note: Health and Social Care (Reform) Act (Northern Ireland) 2009 (c. 1 (N.I.))) and to make amendments consequential on that Act.
Financial Provisions Act (Northern Ireland) 2014	2014 c. 6 (N.I.)	28 April 2014
An Act to repeal the Development Loans (Agriculture and Fisheries) Act (Northern Ireland) 1968; (Note: Development Loans (Agriculture and Fisheries) Act (Northern Ireland) 1968 (c. 21 (N.I.))) to enable the Department of Agriculture and Rural Development to pay grants to certain harbour authorities; to amend the Rates (Northern Ireland) Order 1977; (Note: Rates (Northern Ireland) Order 1977 (SI 1977/2157)) to make provision in relation to the payment of interest on funds in court; to make provision enabling the Northern Ireland Housing Executive to recover certain costs; to make provision for the disclosure of data obtained by the Comptroller and Auditor General for data matching purposes; to enable the Department of Justice to make payments to certain bodies providing services for the police, etc.; and for purposes connected with those matters.
Carrier Bags Act (Northern Ireland) 2014	2014 c. 7 (N.I.)	28 April 2014
An Act to amend the Climate Change Act 2008 to confer powers to make provision about charging for carrier bags; to amend the Single Use Carrier Bags Charge Regulations (Northern Ireland) 2013; (Note: Single Use Carrier Bags Charge Regulations (Northern Ireland) 2013 (SR(NI) 2013/4)) and for connected purposes.
Local Government Act (Northern Ireland) 2014	2014 c. 8 (N.I.)	12 May 2014
An Act to amend the law relating to local government.
Licensing of Pavement Cafés Act (Northern Ireland) 2014	2014 c. 9 (N.I.)	12 May 2014
An Act to make provision for the regulation by district councils of the placing on public areas of furniture for use for the consumption of food or drink.
Budget (No. 2) Act (Northern Ireland) 2014 (repealed)	2014 c. 10 (N.I.)	16 July 2014
An Act to authorise the issue out of the Consolidated Fund of certain sums for the service of the year ending 31st March 2015; to appropriate those sums for specified purposes; to authorise the Department of Finance and Personnel to borrow on the credit of the appropriated sums; to authorise the use for the public service of certain resources (including accruing resources) for the year ending 31st March 2015; and to repeal certain spent provisions. (Repealed by Northern Ireland Budget Act 2017 (c. 34 (N.I.)))
Legal Aid and Coroners' Courts Act (Northern Ireland) 2014	2014 c. 11 (N.I.)	17 November 2014
An Act to dissolve the Northern Ireland Legal Services Commission and provide for the exercise of functions of the Commission by the Department of Justice or the Director of Legal Aid Casework; to amend the law on legal aid in criminal proceedings, civil legal services and criminal defence services; to provide for the Lord Chief Justice to be president of the coroners' courts and for the appointment of a Presiding coroner; and for connected purposes.
Education Act (Northern Ireland) 2014	2014 c. 12 (N.I.)	11 December 2014
An Act to provide for the establishment and functions of the Education Authority; to confer power on the Department of Education to make grants to sectoral bodies; and for connected purposes.
