= Prothonotary =

Legal and ecclesiastical office

A prothonotary is the "principal clerk of a court," from Late Latin prothonotarius (c. 400), from Greek protonotarios "first scribe," originally the chief of the college of recorders of the court of the Byzantine Empire, from Greek πρῶτος protos "first" + Latin notarius ("notary"); the h appeared in Medieval Latin. The title was awarded to certain high-ranking notaries, and was first recorded in the English language in 1447.

== Usage ==
=== Byzantine Empire ===
The office of prōtonotarios (Greek: πρωτονοτάριος), also proedros or primikērios of the notarioi, existed in mid-Byzantine (7th through 10th centuries) administration as head of the colleges of the notarioi in various administrative departments. There were prōtonotarioi of the imperial notarioi (secretaries of the court), of the various sekreta or logothesia (government ministries), as well as for each thema or province. The latter appeared in the early 9th century and functioned as the chief civil officials of the province, directly below the governing general (stratēgos). They were responsible chiefly for administrative and fiscal affairs (characteristically, they belonged to the financial ministry of the Sakellion), and were also responsible for the provisioning of the thematic armies. The office vanished after the 11th and 12th centuries, along with the themata and the logothesia, although there are traces of a single prōtonotarios functioning as the emperor's chief secretary until the Palaiologan period.

=== Catholic Church ===
In the Roman Catholic Church, protonotaries apostolic (Latin protonotarii apostolicii) are prelates in the Roman Curia who perform certain duties with regard to papal documents. Also, after examining the candidates, they name annually a fixed number of doctors of theology and canon law. Historically, the college of protonotaries developed out of the seven regional notaries of Roman antiquity, and are therefore called protonotaries de numero (of the number). They are also called "participating" protonotaries, because they shared in the revenues as officials of the Roman Chancery.

These high papal officials are the highest class of Monsignor, are often raised directly to the cardinalate, and hold distinctive privileges in address and attire. Current practice is based on Pope Paul VI's two motu proprios, Pontificalis Domus of March 28, 1968 and Pontificalia Insignia of June 21, 1968. They are addressed formally as "most reverend monsignor," and they wear the mantelletta, the purple choir cassock, the biretta with red tuft, and rochet for liturgical services, the black cassock with red piping and purple sash at other times, and may add the purple ferraiuolo to the black cassock for formal ceremonies of a non-liturgical nature, e.g., a graduation.

There are also honorary protonotaries, referred to as supernumerary (or "beyond the number"), on whom the pope has conferred this title and its special privileges. This title is purely honorary and is not attached to any duties in the Curia. This is the type of protonotary found outside of Rome, and is the highest grade of monsignor found in most dioceses. Priests so honored are addressed as "reverend monsignor," wear the purple choir cassock (with surplice) for liturgical services, the black cassock with red piping and purple sash at other times, may add the purple ferraiuolo to this for formal non-liturgical ceremonies, and may put the letters "P.A." after their names, but use none of the other accoutrements mentioned above.

=== Courts in common law jurisdictions ===
The term prothonotary is the title of the chief court clerk in several common law jurisdictions.

==== Australia ====
The chief clerks of the supreme courts of the Australian states of New South Wales and Victoria are titled "prothonotary."

The prothonotary of the Victorian Supreme Court has responsibility for all administrative tasks of the trial division registry. Under the Supreme Court Act 1986 (Vic), and the accompanying rules, the prothonotary also has some quasi-judicial powers including taxation of costs, conducting mediations, prosecuting contempt and administering bail.

Much of the work of the prothonotary is delegated to specifically appointed deputy prothonotaries who, under the Supreme Court Act (s108), have the same powers and authority as the prothonotary.

==== Canada ====
===== Federal Court =====
Prior to October 12, 2022, the Federal Court had the position of prothonotaries, who were judicial officers (not clerks). They were appointed by the federal Cabinet and could exercise many of the powers and functions of judges of the Federal Court.

In 2022, the office of prothonotary was renamed "Associate Judges".

===== Provincial courts =====
In the courts of Nova Scotia and Prince Edward Island, the prothonotary is the chief court clerk. In Quebec, prothonotary (French: protonotaire) was formerly used to identify the official now referred to as the clerk of the Superior Court of Quebec.

==== England ====
The chief clerk of the Court of King's Bench and the Court of Common Pleas was known as the Prothonotary. His deputy was the Second Prothonotary or Secondary. The positions were well paid and could be purchased. The posts, which had largely become sinecures, were abolished in 1837 and replaced by that of Master. The prothonotary and his deputy were the principal officers on the civil side of the palatine Court of Pleas of the County Palatine of Durham and Sadberge. The prothonotary and his deputy were the principal officers of the palatine Court of Common Pleas of the County Palatine of Lancaster. The office continued to exist up to the abolition of the two palatine courts by the Supreme Court of Judicature Act 1873.

==== India ====
The chief clerk and head of the administrative division of the Bombay High Court is known as the Prothonotary and Senior Master.

==== United States ====
While the term was once commonly used in the United States, only the courts of Pennsylvania and Delaware still term their chief clerks "prothonotaries".

===== Pennsylvania =====
The Unified Judicial System of Pennsylvania titles several of its court administrators prothonotaries. The Supreme Court of Pennsylvania maintains two deputy prothonotaries, one in Philadelphia and the other in Pittsburgh, supplementing the role of the prothonotary in Harrisburg. The Superior Court of Pennsylvania's chief administrative officer is also titled a prothonotary and also maintains offices in Harrisburg, Philadelphia, and Pittsburgh.

The Pennsylvania Courts of Common Pleas also title their chief clerks prothonotaries, except for the District of Delaware County, which has a clerk of courts instead of a prothonotary under the terms of its special Home Rule Charter. Similarly, Allegheny County's clerks are consolidated as the Department of Court Records, and there is no longer a Prothonotary in that county. The Commonwealth Court of Pennsylvania and the minor courts (the magisterial district courts, the Philadelphia Municipal Court, and the Pittsburgh Municipal Court) do not have prothonotaries; their administrators are titled a "Chief Clerk" and "administrators," respectively.

U.S. President Harry S. Truman was introduced to a prothonotary during a campaign stop in Pittsburgh in 1948. It is rumored that Truman's first reaction upon hearing the term "prothonotary" was to say "What the hell is a prothonotary?" It has also been claimed that Truman called "prothonotary" the most impressive-sounding political title in the U.S.

=== Croatia – Historical usage ===
The prothonotary of the Kingdom of Croatia was a high-ranking official of the realm elected from the 14th century until 1848. He was tasked with recording and certifying minutes of the Sabor, drawing up and certifying decisions of the courts of the Ban of Croatia, leading the Croatian delegation to the Diet of Hungary, safekeeping of documents, as well as safekeeping of the seal of the Ban of Croatia and the seal of state. He was elected by the Sabor from the ranks of the Croatian nobility and confirmed by the Ban of Croatia.

== Sources ==
- Herbermann, Charles, ed. (1913). "Prothonotary Apostolic" . Catholic Encyclopedia. New York: Robert Appleton Company.
