= Court of Pleas of the County Palatine of Durham and Sadberge =

The Court of Pleas of the County Palatine of Durham and Sadberge, sometimes called the Court of Pleas or Common Pleas of or at Durham was a court of common pleas that exercised jurisdiction within the County Palatine of Durham (including the wapentake of Sadberge) until its jurisdiction was transferred to the High Court by the Supreme Court of Judicature Act 1873. Before the transfer of its jurisdiction, this tribunal was next in importance to the Chancery of Durham. The Court of Pleas probably developed from the free court of the Bishop of Durham. The Court of Pleas was clearly visible as a distinct court, separate from the Chancery, in the thirteenth century.

== Judges ==
The judges who went the Northern Circuit, and to whom a commission to take the assizes at Durham was directed, were judges of the court, and continued to be so, until another commission, directed to other judges, was issued for the next subsequent assizes; during which time, besides trying causes at the assizes, they held courts from time to time in London, for the purpose of granting and deciding upon rules, etc. And the judges of the court for the time being could make rules for regulating the proceedings in actions, and the mode and time of pleading; or they or any two of them could adopt any such rules made by any of the superior courts at Westminster.

== Officers ==
The prothonotary and his deputy were the principal officers on the civil side of the court; and his office at Durham was in fact the office of the court, where all the business out of court was transacted. The prothonotary had to keep three books; one, called the remembrance book, where the writs of pone and rules of court were entered; another, for entering the writs of summons and the appearances; and the third was an index of the names of the defendants in the two former. The justices of the court could regulate the fees to be taken by the officers, and by the attorneys.

== Jurisdiction ==
The jurisdiction of the Court of Pleas of Durham inside the county palatine included jurisdiction similar to the jurisdiction of the Court of Common Pleas at Westminster and the Court of King's Bench.

Nothing contained in section 1 of the Durham (County Palatine) Act 1836 prejudiced or affected the jurisdiction of this court.

== Procedure ==
Court of Pleas of Durham Act 1839
- Act of Parliament
- Parliament of the United Kingdom
- Long title: An Act for improving the Practice and Proceedings of the Court of Pleas of the County Palatine of Durham and Sadberge.
- Citation: 2 & 3 Vict. c. 16
- Territorial extent: United Kingdom

Dates
- Royal assent: 14 June 1839
- Commencement: 14 June 1839 (Note: The Acts of Parliament (Commencement) Act 1793.)
- Repealed: 15 August 1879
Other legislation
Amended by	Statute Law Revision Act 1874 (No. 2)
Repealed by	Civil Procedure Acts Repeal Act 1879

Status: Repealed

Text of statute as originally enacted

As to practice and proceedings in the Court of Pleas in Durham, see the Court of Pleas of Durham Act 1839 2 & 3 Vict. c. 16 (sometimes called Court of Pleas of Durham Act 1839), the Common Law Procedure Act 1852 (15 & 16 Vict. c. 76), section 100 of the Common Law Procedure Act 1854 (17 & 18 Vict. c. 125), and the Common Law Procedure Act 1860 (23 & 24 Vict. c. 126).

Appeal

An appeal lay from this court to the Queen's Bench.

== Costs ==
From 1839, the practice and proceedings in the Court of Pleas of the county palatine of Durham and Sadberge, were in a main degree assimilated to those in the three Courts of Law at Westminster. The costs for preparing pleadings in actions here, were by express enactment made the same as those of a like description in the Superior Courts. Provisions were made as to the costs with respect to the admission upon the trial of written and printed documents, and copies; taxation of costs; costs on paying money into Court; fees to the officers; costs on motions for new trials in the Superior Courts; on removal of judgments; removal of causes; on writs of false judgment; and as to the expenses of witnesses; and any rule of Court made here, could be made a rule of any of the Superior Courts of Law at Westminster.

== Relevant legislation ==
See section 86 of the County Courts Act 1856 (19 & 20 Vict. c. 108).

According to Baxter (note 61 at p 173), the principal statutes relating to Durham and its Court of Pleas included, amongst others, the following:

As to the process of Exigent in Durham, see the act 31 Eliz. 1. c. 9.

As to judgment in the Court of Pleas of Durham, see the act 8 Geo. 1. c. 25 and the Judgments Act 1838 (1 & 2 Vict. c. 110).

As to taking oaths and affidavits in Durham, see the act 4 Geo. 3. c. 21

As to order of Court of Pleas for examination of witnesses and interrogatories, see the Evidence by Commission Act 1831 (1 Will. 4. c. 22).

As to palatine jurisdiction and jura regalia transferred to the Crown, see the Durham (County Palatine) Act 1836 (6 & 7 Will. 4. c. 19).

As to the appointment of custos rotulorum in Durham, see the Durham (County Palatine) Act 1836 (6 & 7 Will 4. c. 19).

As to duties and salaries of Clerks of the Crown in Durham, see the Criminal Justice Act 1856 (19 & 20 Vict. c. 118).

As to transfer of jura regalia of Durham to Crown, see the Durham County Palatine Act 1858 (21 & 22 Vict. c. 45).

== Transfer of jurisdiction to the High Court ==
Section 16(10) of the Supreme Court of Judicature Act 1873 provided that "there shall be transferred to and vested in" the "High Court of Justice the jurisdiction which, at the commencement of this Act, was vested in, or capable of being exercised by" the Court of Pleas at Durham. This provision was repealed and replaced by section 18(2)(a)(vi) of the Supreme Court of Judicature (Consolidation) Act 1925, which was to the same effect.

As to prothonotaries, district prothonotaries and other officers of the Court of Pleas, see section 78 of the Supreme Court of Judicature Act 1873.

== See also ==
- Courts of the County Palatine of Durham

== Bibliography ==
- Kenneth Emsley and Constance Mary Fraser. The Courts of the County Palatine of Durham from the Earliest Times to 1971. Durham County Local History Society. Durham. 1984.
- John Frederick Archbold. A Summary of the Laws of England: In Four Volumes. Shaw and Sons. Fetter Lane, London. 1848. Volume 1. Pages 184 to 200.
- William Fordyce. "Court of Pleas". The History and Antiquities of the County Palatine of Durham. A Fullerton & Co. 1857. Volume 1. Page 367
- William Whellan & Co. "Court of Pleas". History, Topography and Directory of the County Palatine of Durham. Whittaker & Co. London. Galt & Co. Manchester. 1856. p 174.
- William Parson and William White. History, Directory and Gazetteer, of the Counties of Durham and Northumberland. Printed for W White & Co by Edward Baines and Son. 1827. Volume 1. Page 187. 1828.
- Gailard Thomas Lapsley. The County Palatine of Durham: A Study in Constitutional History. (Harvard Historical Studies, volume 8). 1900. Pages 204 to 206. Internet Archive:
- Wynne E Baxter. The Law and Practice of the Supreme Court of Judicature. Butterworths. Simpkin, Marshall & Co. London. 1874. Pages 10, 30, 52, 53, 65, 173 (Note 61), 174, 181.
- George Barclay Mansel. The Law and Practice as to Costs. Spettigue. London. 1840. Pages 131, 146, 164, 192.
- Samuel Prentice. Chitty's Archbold's Practice of the Court of Queen's Bench in Personal Actions and Ejectment. Eleventh Edition. H Sweet. V and R Stevens, Sons and Haynes. 1862. Volume 2. Pages 1055, 1099, 1325, 1326, 1381, 1384, 1391, 1484, 1565.
- Sixteenth Report of the Deputy Keeper of the Public Records. 2 June 1855. HMSO. pp 46, 48, 49, 54, 64.
- (1846) 41 Parliamentary Papers
- Halsbury's Statutes of England, Second Edition, 1950, vol 18, pp 423–425 and passim Google Books
- William Bagley. The New Practice of the Courts of Law at Westminster. A Maxwell. London. 1841. p 459
- Reports of the Commissioners Appointed to Inquire into the Practice and Proceedings of the Superior Courts of Common Law. Passim.
- George Barclay Mansel. The Practice Upon Writ of Trial, for Debts not Exceeding £20. S Sweet. London. 1833. p 18.
