= Administration of Justice Act 1977 =

Act of the Parliament of the United Kingdom

Administration of Justice Act 1977 (Note: Section 32(1).)
- Act of Parliament
- Parliament of the United Kingdom
- Long title: An Act to make further provision with respect to the administration of justice and matters connected therewith, to alter the method of protecting mortgages of registered land and to amend the law relating to oaths and affirmations and to the interest of a surviving spouse in an intestate’s estate.
- Citation: 1977 c. 38
- Territorial extent: England and Wales (in part); Scotland (in part); Northern Ireland (in part); (Note: Section 32(8)–(12).)

Dates
- Royal assent: 29 July 1977
- Commencement: various (Note: Section 32(5)–(7).)
Other legislation
Amends	Lunacy Regulation (Ireland) Act 1871; Bills of Exchange Act 1882; Coroners Act 1887; Oaths Act 1888; Land Registration Act 1925; Administration of Estates Act 1925; Supreme Court of Judicature (Consolidation) Act 1925; Administration of Justice (Scotland) Act 1933; Welsh Courts Act 1942; Juries Act 1949; Coroners Act 1954; Administration of Justice (Scotland) Act 1933; Pensions Appeal Tribunals Act 1943; Justices of the Peace Act 1949; Arbitration Act 1950; Maintenance Orders Act 1950; Maintenance Orders Act 1958; County Courts Act 1959; Oaths Act 1961; Administration of Justice Act 1965; Courts-Martial (Appeals) Act 1968; Proceedings Against Estates Act 1970; Courts Act 1971; Attachment of Earnings Act 1971; Sheriff Courts (Scotland) Act 1971; Costs in Criminal Cases Act 1973; Administration of Justice Act 1973; Powers of Criminal Courts Act 1973; Juries Act 1974; District Courts (Scotland) Act 1975; Employment Protection Act 1975; See § Repealed enactments
Repeals/revokes	See § Repealed enactments
Amended by	Judicature (Northern Ireland) Act 1978; Oaths Act 1978; Employment Protection (Consolidation) Act 1978; Justices of the Peace Act 1979; Senior Courts Act 1981; County Courts Act 1984; Legal Aid (Scotland) Act 1986; Coroners Act 1988; Legal Aid Act 1988; Court of Session Act 1988; Arbitration Act 1996; Land Registration Act 2002; Courts Act 2003; Statute Law (Repeals) Act 2004; Constitutional Reform Act 2005; Crime and Courts Act 2013; Inheritance and Trustees' Powers Act 2014

Status: Amended

Text of statute as originally enacted

Revised text of statute as amended

Text of the Administration of Justice Act 1977 as in force today (including any amendments) within the United Kingdom, from legislation.gov.uk.

The Administration of Justice Act 1977 (c. 38) is an act of the Parliament of the United Kingdom.

== Part I - General ==
=== Section 6 - Temporary additional judges for Employment Appeal Tribunal ===
This section was repealed by section 159(3) of, and Schedule 17 to, the Employment Protection (Consolidation) Act 1978.

=== Section 8 - Oaths and affirmations ===
This section was repealed on 31 July 1978 by Part I of the Schedule to the Oaths Act 1978.

== Part II - England and Wales ==
=== Section 9 - Appeals ===
This section was repealed by section 152(4) of, and Schedule 7 to, the Senior Courts Act 1981.

=== Section 10 - Appointment to office ===
This section was repealed by section 152(4) of, and Schedule 7 to, the Senior Courts Act 1981.

=== Section 23 - Jurisdiction of ancient courts ===
This section, with Schedule 4 and Part V of Schedule 5, implemented recommendations made, in the report "Jurisdiction of Certain Ancient Courts", by the Law Commission. It provided that certain courts would cease to have jurisdiction to hear and determine legal proceedings, but could continue to sit and transact other business it could customarily transact.

The courts affected were:

- Courts baron
- Courts leet
- Customary courts of the manor
- Courts of pie poudre
- Courts of the staple
- Courts of the clerks of the markets (or clerk of the market)
- Hundred courts
- Law Days
- Views of frankpledge
- Common law (or sheriffs') county courts as known before the passing of the County Courts Act 1846 (9 & 10 Vict. c. 95).
- The Basingstoke Court of Ancient Demesne
- The Coventry Court of Orphans
- The Great Grimsby Foreign Court
- The King's Lynn Court of Tolbooth
- The City of London Court of Husting
- The City of London Sheriffs' Court for the Poultry Compter
- The City of London Sheriffs' Court for the Giltspur Street Compter
- The Macclesfield Court of Portmote
- The Maidstone Court of Conservancy
- The Melcombe Regis Court of Husting
- The Newcastle upon Tyne Courts of Conscience or Requests and Conservancy
- The Norwich Court of Mayoralty
- The Peterborough Dean and Chapter’s Court of Common Pleas
- The Ramsey (Cambridgeshire) Court of Pleas
- The Ripon Court Military
- The Ripon Dean and Chapter’s Canon Fee Court
- The St. Albans Court of Requests
- The Court of the Hundred, Manor and Borough of Tiverton
- The York Courts of Husting, Guildhall and Conservancy
- The Ancient Prescriptive Court of Wells
- The Cheney (or Cheyney) Court of the Bishop of Winchester.

It also limited the Court of the Chancellor or Vice-Chancellor of Oxford University and the Cambridge University Chancellor’s Court to jurisdiction under the statutes of those universities.

== Section 26 ==
From 1 February 1978, the provisions of section 26(2) relating to mortgage cautions, subject to any necessary modification, apply also to sub-mortgage cautions. The Land Registration Rules 1977 (SI 1977/2089) are consequential on section 26.

== Part III - Other provisions ==
=== Section 32 - Citation etc ===
The following orders were made under section 32(6):

- The Administration of Justice Act 1977 (Commencement No. 1) Order 1977 (SI 1977/1405)
- The Administration of Justice Act 1977 (Commencement No. 2) Order 1977 (SI 1977/1490) (C. 53)
- The Administration of Justice Act 1977 (Commencement No. 3) Order 1977 (SI 1977/1589)
- The Administration of Justice Act 1977 (Commencement No. 4) Order 1977 (SI 1977/2202)
- The Administration of Justice Act 1977 (Commencement No. 5) Order 1978 (SI 1978/810). Made on 6 June 1978.
- The Administration of Justice Act 1977 (Commencement No. 6) Order 1979 (SI 1979/972) (C. 27)
- The Administration of Justice Act 1977 (Commencement No. 7) Order 1980 (SI 1980/1981)

=== Repealed enactments ===
Section 32(4) of the act repealed 76 enactments and revoked one instrument, listed in parts I to VI of schedule 5 to the act.

==== Part I: Judgments etc. in foreign currency ====
Part I — Judgments etc. in foreign currency
Citation	Short title	Extent of repeal
45 & 46 Vict. c. 61	Bills of Exchange Act 1882	Section 57(2). Section 72(4).
23 & 24 Geo. 5. c. 13	Foreign Judgments (Reciprocal Enforcement) Act 1933	Section 2(3).
1966 c. 41	Arbitration (International Investment Disputes) Act 1966	Section 1(3).
SI 1972/1590	European Communities (Enforcement of Community Judgments) Order 1972	Article 3(2).

==== Part II: Determination of expenses etc. ====
Part II — Determination of expenses etc.
Citation	Short title	Extent of repeal
50 & 51 Vict. c. 71	Coroners Act 1887	Section 25A(4).
6 & 7 Geo. 6. c. 39	Pensions Appeal Tribunals Act 1943	In the Schedule, paragraph 5(4)(a).
1973 c. 15	Administration of Justice Act 1973	In Schedule 1, in paragraph 8(1), the words " at the prescribed rates " and " at the prescribed rate ".
1973 c. 62	Powers of Criminal Courts Act 1973	In Schedule 3, in paragraph 18(2)(a), the words " the rates of allowances and ".
1974 c. 23	Juries Act 1974	Section 19(7).
1975 c. 20	District Courts (Scotland) Act 1975	In section 17(1), the words " at the prescribed rates " and " at the prescribed rate ".

==== Part III: Oaths and affirmations ====
Part III — Oaths and affirmations
Citation	Short title	Extent of repeal
6 & 7 Vict. c. 85	Evidence Act 1843	In section 1, the words " in those cases wherein affirmation is by law receivable ".
31 & 32 Vict. c. 72	Promissory Oaths Act 1868	Section 11.
34 & 35 Vict. c. 83	Parliamentary Witnesses Oaths Act 1871	In section 1, the words from " Where " to " form " and the words " or affirmation ".
52 & 53 Vict. c. 63	Interpretation Act 1889	In section 3, in the definitions of the expressions " oath" and " affidavit ", the words " in the case of persons for the time being allowed by law to affirm or declare instead of swearing", and in the definition of the expression "swear", the words "in the like case ".
1 & 2 Geo. 5. c. 6	Perjury Act 1911	In section 15(2), in the definition of the expression " oath ", the words " in the case of persons for the time being allowed by law to affirm or declare instead of swearing ", and in the definition of the expression " swear", the words " in the like case ".
23 & 24 Geo. 5. c. 20	False Oaths (Scotland) Act 1933	In section 7(1)(b), the words " by a person for the time being allowed by law to affirm or declare, instead of swearing ".
1954 c. 33 (N.I.)	Interpretation Act (Northern Ireland) 1954	In section 26(2), in the definition of " oath " the words " as respects persons for the time being allowed by law to affirm or declare instead of swearing " and in the definition of " swear " the words " in the like case".
3 & 4 Eliz. 2. c. 18	Army Act 1955	In section 102(a), the words from " and " to " belief " in the second place where it occurs.
3 & 4 Eliz. 2. c. 19	Air Force Act 1955	In section 102(a), the words from " and " to " belief " in the second place where it occurs.
5 & 6 Eliz. 2. c. 53	Naval Discipline Act 1957	In section 60(4)(a), the words from " and " to " belief " in the second place where it occurs.
9 & 10 Eliz. 2. c. 21	Oaths Act 1961	In section 1(1), the words " in certain cases " and the words from " on " to the end of the subsection, and section 2(2).

==== Part IV: Appeals ====
Part IV — Appeals
Citation	Short title	Extent of repeal
44 & 45 Vict. c. 68	Supreme Court of Judicature Act 1881	The whole act.
15 & 16 Geo. 5. c. 49	Supreme Court of Judicature (Consolidation) Act 1925	Section 27(2). In section 63(1), from " and in " to the end. In section 63(6)(c), the words " for hearing such an appeal as aforesaid ".
6 & 7 Eliz. 2. c. 39	Maintenance Orders Act 1958	In section 4(7), from " and so much " to the end.
8 & 9 Eliz. 2. c. 58	Charities Act 1960	Section 42(3).
1967 c. 22	Agriculture Act 1967	In section 21(5), from " and this subsection " to the end.
1969 c. 58	Administration of Justice Act 1969	Section 15(2)(a).
1971 c. 62	Tribunals and Inquiries Act 1971	In section 13(4), from the beginning to " court; but".
1971 c. 78	Town and Country Planning Act 1971	In sections 246(4) and 247(5), the words from the beginning to " but".
1973 c. 38	Social Security Act 1973	Section 86(7).
1974 c. 52	Trade Union and Labour Relations Act 1974	In section 21(9), the words from the beginning to " court; but".
1975 c. 14	Social Security Act 1975	Section 94(6).

==== Part V: Ancient courts ====
Part V — Ancient courts
Citation	Short title	Extent of repeal
7 & 8 Vict. c. 19	Inferior Courts Act 1844	The whole act.
7 & 8 Vict. c. 96	Execution Act 1844	Section 72. In section 73, the words from " the word " to " and " in the third place where it occurs. Schedule (B).
8 & 9 Vict. c. 127	Small Debts Act 1845	Sections 9 to 12, 14, 16 to 21 and 23. Section 24, except the words " In the construction of this Act every word importing the masculine gender shall include females as well as males ". Schedule (C).
19 & 20 Vict. c. xvii	Cambridge Award Act 1856	Section 18.
20 & 21 Vict. c. clvii	Mayor's Court of London Procedure Act 1857	The whole act.
35 & 36 Vict. c. 86	Borough and Local Courts of Record Act 1872	The whole act.
46 & 47 Vict. c. 18	Municipal Corporations Act 1883	Sections 6, 22 and 23.
50 & 51 Vict. c. 55	Sheriffs Act 1887	Sections 18 and 40(1).
51 & 52 Vict. c. 57	Statute Law Revision (No. 2) Act 1888	Section 2.
53 & 54 Vict. c. 33	Statute Law Revision Act 1890	Section 4.
53 & 54 Vict. c. 51	Statute Law Revision (No. 2) Act 1890	Section 2.
54 & 55 Vict. c. 67	Statute Law Revision Act 1891	Section 2.
55 & 56 Vict. c. 19	Statute Law Revision Act 1892	Section 2.
56 & 57 Vict. c. 14	Statute Law Revision Act 1893	Section 2.
56 & 57 Vict. c. 54	Statute Law Revision (No. 2) Act 1893	Section 2.
57 & 58 Vict. c. 56	Statute Law Revision Act 1894	Section 2.
61 & 62 Vict. c. 22	Statute Law Revision Act 1898	Section 2.
8 Edw. 7. c. 49	Statute Law Revision Act 1908	Section 2.
3 & 4 Geo. 5. c. xcii	Derby Corporation Act 1913	Sections 98 and 100(2).
15 & 16 Geo. 5. c. 49	Supreme Court of Judicature (Consolidation) Act 1925	Part IX.
17 & 18 Geo. 5. c. 42	Statute Law Revision Act 1927	Section 2.
17 & 18 Geo. 5. c. xcii	Derby Corporation Act 1927	Section 92.
10 & 11 Geo. 6. c. 14	Exchange Control Act 1947	In Schedule 4, in paragraph 3, paragraph (ii) of the proviso and the word " and " immediately preceding the said paragraph (ii).
10 & 11 Geo. 6. c. 44	Crown Proceedings Act 1947	Section 34.
11 & 12 Geo. 6. c. 62	Statute Law Revision Act 1948	Section 2.
14 Geo. 6. c. 6	Statute Law Revision Act 1950	Section 2.
2 & 3 Eliz. 2. c. 5	Statute Law Revision Act 1953	Section 2.
7 & 8 Eliz. 2. c. 22	County Courts Act 1959	Sections 140, 162, 198 and 205(8).

==== Part VI: Miscellaneous ====
Part VI — Miscellaneous
Citation	Short title	Extent of repeal
15 & 16 Geo. 5. c. 21	Land Registration Act 1925	Section 82(3)(b).
15 & 16 Geo. 5. c. 23	Administration of Estates Act 1925	Section 47A(2) and (4).
15 & 16 Geo. 5. c. 49	Supreme Court of Judicature (Consolidation) Act 1925	In section 99(4), the words " being members of the General Council of the Bar.". In Schedule 4, in paragraphs 6(ii), (iii) and 7(iv), the words from " provided " to " standing", in paragraph 9(i) the word " practising ", and paragraph 9(ii).
18 & 19 Geo. 5. c. 26	Administration of Justice Act 1928	Section 15.
1 & 2 Geo. 6. c. 63	Administration of Justice (Miscellaneous Provisions) Act 1938	In Schedule 2, the amendment of section 116(3) of the Supreme Court of Judicature (Consolidation) Act 1925.
7 & 8 Eliz. 2. c. 22	County Courts Act 1959	In section 2, in subsection (2)(a) the words from " and the places " to the end, in subsection (2)(b) the words " discontinue the holding of any court", subsection (2)(c) and subsection (3)(a). Section 60(2). In section 168(c), the words " by them ". In section 182, subsection (1), and in subsection (2) from the beginning to " subsection ". Section 183.
8 & 9 Eliz. 2. c. 48	Matrimonial Proceedings (Magistrates' Courts) Act 1960	Section 14(1).
8 & 9 Eliz. 2. c. 58	Charities Act 1960	In Schedule 6, the entry relating to the Administration of Justice Act 1928.
1966 c. 31	Criminal Appeal Act 1966	In section 3(5), the word " practising ", wherever occurring.
1968 c. 20	Courts-Martial (Appeals) Act 1968	Section 35.
1969 c. 58	Administration of Justice Act 1969	Section 4(3).
1971 c. 23	Courts Act 1971	In Schedule 8, paragraph 35(2).
1972 c. 50	Legal Advice and Assistance Act 1972	In section 6(1)(b), the words " subsections (1) to (3) of section 6,".
1972 c. 67	Companies (Floating Charges and Receivers) (Scotland) Act 1972	Section 15(4).
1973 c. 15	Administration of Justice Act 1973	Section 7(1).
1973 c. 18	Matrimonial Causes Act 1973	In section 50, the words " being members of the General Council of the Bar ".
1974 c. 4	Legal Aid Act 1974	Section 9(3).
