= List of statutory instruments of the United Kingdom, 1977 =

This is an incomplete list of statutory instruments of the United Kingdom in 1977.

== Statutory instruments ==
=== 1-499 ===
==== 1–99 ====
- Local Government Area Changes (Scotland) Regulations 1977 (SI 1977/8)
- City of Edinburgh and West Lothian Districts (Inchgarvie and Drumshoreland) Boundaries Order 1977 (SI 1977/9) (S. 2)
- Lothian and Strathclyde Regions (Motherwell and West Lothian Districts) Boundaries Order 1977 (SI 1977/10)
- Central and Strathclyde Regions (Bearsden and Milngavie, Stirling and Strathkelvin Districts) Boundaries Order 1977 (SI 1977/11) (S. 4)
- Monklands and Motherwell Districts (Chapelhall) Boundaries Order 1977 (SI 1977/13) (S. 5)
- Caithness and Sutherland Districts (Tongue and Farr) Boundaries Order 1977 (SI 1977/14) (S. 6)
- Hamilton and Motherwell Districts (Strathclyde Park) Boundaries Order 1977 (SI 1977/15) (S. 7)
- Cumnock and Doon Valley and Kyle and Carrick Districts (Dalrymple) Boundaries Order 1977 (SI 1977/16) (S. 8)
- Highland and Strathclyde Regions (Duror and Glen Etive and Glencoe) Boundaries Order 1977 (SI 1977/22) (S. 10)
- Noxious Weeds (Northern Ireland) Order 1977 (SI 1977/52) (N.I. 1)
- Lothian and Strathclyde Regions (Motherwell and West Lothian Districts) (Revocation) Boundaries Order 1977 (SI 1977/63)

==== 100–199 ====
- Shetland Islands Area (Electoral Arrangements) Order 1977 (SI 1977/196)

==== 200–299 ====
- Local Authorities' Cemeteries Order 1977 (SI 1977/204)
- Royal and other Parks and Gardens Regulations 1977 (SI 1977/217)
- The Berkshire and Oxfordshire (Areas) Order 1977 (SI 1977/218)
- The Berkshire and Buckinghamshire (Areas) Order 1977 (SI 1977/219)
- Town and Country Planning (Listed Buildings and Buildings in Conservation Areas) Regulations 1977 (SI 1977/228)
- The District of South Norfolk (Electoral Arrangements) Order 1977 (SI 1977/237)
- Merchant Shipping (Smooth and partially Smooth Waters) Rules 1977 (SI 1977/252)
- Town and Country Planning General Development Order 1977 (SI 1977/289)
- Health and Safety at Work etc. Act 1974 (Commencement No. 4) Order 1977 (SI 1977/294) (C.10)
- The Cornwall and Devon (Areas) Order 1977 (SI 1977/299)

==== 300–399 ====
- The Deddington and North Aston (Areas) Order 1977 (SI 1977/335)
- Social Security (Dependency) Regulations 1977 (SI 1977/343)
- Matrimonial Causes Rules 1977 (SI 1977/344)
- The East Kilbride and Hamilton Districts (Sandford) Boundaries Order 1977 (SI 1977/378) (S. 39)
- The District of Sedgemoor (Electoral Arrangements) Order 1977 (SI 1977/379)
- The Berkshire and Oxfordshire (Areas) (Amendment) Order 1977 (SI 1977/381)
- The Runnymede and Woking (Areas) Order 1977 (SI 1977/382)

==== 400–499 ====
- The Borough of Boston (Electoral Arrangements) Order 1977 (SI 1977/412)
- The City of Hereford (Electoral Arrangements) Order 1977 (SI 1977/413)
- The City of Worcester (Electoral Arrangements) Order 1977 (SI 1977/414)
- Criminal Damage (Northern Ireland) Order 1977 (SI 1977/426) (N.I. 4)
- Nuclear Installations (Isle of Man) Order 1977 (SI 1977/429)
- The District of West Derbyshire (Electoral Arrangements) Order 1977 (SI 1977/437)
- The District of South Herefordshire (Electoral Arrangements) Order 1977 (SI 1977/438)
- Offshore Installations (Life-saving Appliances) Regulations 1977 (SI 1977/486)

=== 500-999 ===
==== 500–599 ====
- The Borough of Crewe and Nantwich (Electoral Arrangements) Order 1977 (SI 1977/510)
- Alton and Alresford Light Railway Order 1977 (SI 1977/519)
- The City of Lancaster (Electoral Arrangements) Order 1977 (SI 1977/538)
- The District of Woodspring (Electoral Arrangements) Order 1977 (SI 1977/546)
- Crown Roads (Royal Parks) (Application of Road Traffic Enactments) Order 1977 (SI 1977/548)
- Consumer Protection and Advice (Northern Ireland) Order 1977 (SI 1977/595) (N.I. 6)
- Rates Amendment (Northern Ireland) Order 1977 (SI 1977/598) (N.I. 9)
- Transport (Northern Ireland) Order 1977 (SI 1977/599) (N.I. 10)

==== 600–699 ====
- Social Security (Miscellaneous Provisions) (Northern Ireland) Order 1977 (SI 1977/610) (N.I. 11)
- Teachers (Colleges of Education) (Scotland) Amendment Regulations 1977 (SI 1977/634)
- House-Building Standards (Approved Scheme etc.) Order 1977 (SI 1977/642)
- The District of West Oxfordshire (Electoral Arrangements) Order 1977 (SI 1977/681)

==== 700–799 ====
- Judicial Pensions (Preservation of Benefits) Order 1977 (SI 1977/717)
- The Borough of Oadby and Wigston (Electoral Arrangements) Order 1977 (SI 1977/723)
- The Borough of Melton (Electoral Arrangements) Order 1977 (SI 1977/731)
- The Borough of Nuneaton (Electoral Arrangements) Order 1977 (SI 1977/732)
- Mid Southern Water (Capital Powers) Order 1977 (SI 1977/744)

==== 800–899 ====
- District of Craven (Electoral Arrangements) Order 1977 (SI 1977/864)
- District of Chichester (Electoral Arrangements) Order 1977 (SI 1977/865)
- Nene Valley Light Railway Order 1977 (SI 1977/862)
- District of West Devon (Electoral Arrangements) Order 1977 (SI 1977/866)
- Conveyance in Harbours of Military Explosives Regulations 1977 (SI 1977/890)

==== 900–999 ====
- Ardrossan Harbour Revision Order 1977 (SI 1977/933)
- Local Land Charges Rules 1977 (SI 1977/985)

=== 1000-1499 ===
==== 1000–1099 ====
- Condensed Milk and Dried Milk (Scotland) Regulations 1977 (SI 1977/1027)
- District of Purbeck (Electoral Arrangements) Order 1977 (SI 1977/1064)
- Borough of Scarborough (Electoral Arrangements) Order 1977 (SI 1977/1065)
- District of East Staffordshire (Electoral Arrangements) Order 1977 (SI 1977/1066)

==== 1100–1199 ====
- Merchant Shipping (Seamen's Documents) (Amendment) Regulations 1977 (SI 1977/1181)

==== 1200–1299 ====
- National Savings Bank (Investment Deposits) (Limits) Order 1977 (SI 1977/1210)
- Health and Safety at Work etc. Act 1974 (Application outside Great Britain) Order 1977 (SI 1977/1232)
- Agriculture (Miscellaneous Provisions) (Northern Ireland) Order 1977 (SI 1977/1245) (N.I. 12)
- Criminal Damage (Compensation) (Northern Ireland) Order 1977 (SI 1977/1247) (N.I. 14)
- Criminal Injuries (Compensation) (Northern Ireland) Order 1977 (SI 1977/1248) (N.I. 15)
- Criminal Law (Amendment) (Northern Ireland) Order 1977 (SI 1977/1249) (N.I. 16)
- Family Law Reform (Northern Ireland) Order 1977 (SI 1977/1250) (N.I. 17)
- Fatal Accidents (Northern Ireland) Order 1977 (SI 1977/1251) (N.I. 18)
- Stock Exchange (Completion of Bargains) (Northern Ireland) Order 1977 (SI 1977/1254) (N.I. 21)
- The District of Bracknell (Electoral Arrangements) Order 1977 (SI 1977/1273)
- The City of Norwich (Electoral Arrangements) Order 1977 (SI 1977/1274)
- The London Borough of Sutton (Electoral Arrangements) Order 1977 (SI 1977/1275)
- The District of South Hams (Electoral Arrangements) Order 1977 (SI 1977/1276)
- The District of Bromsgrove (Electoral Arrangements) Order 1977 (SI 1977/1277)
- The London Borough of Hounslow (Electoral Arrangements) Order 1977 (SI 1977/1278)
- The District of Tiverton (Electoral Arrangements) Order 1977 (SI 1977/1279)

==== 1300–1399 ====
- Pensions Increase (Annual Review) Order 1977 (SI 1977/1387)
- The District of Broadland (Electoral Arrangements) Order 1977 (SI 1977/1390)
- The London Borough of Lewisham (Electoral Arrangements) Order 1977 (SI 1977/1391)
- The London Borough of Southwark (Electoral Arrangements) Order 1977 (SI 1977/1392)
- The District of Stratford-on-Avon District (Electoral Arrangements) Order 1977 (SI 1977/1393)

==== 1400–1499 ====
- Administration of Justice Act 1977 (Commencement No. 1) Order 1977 (SI 1977/1405)
- The London Borough of Ealing (Electoral Arrangements) Order 1977 (SI 1977/1414)
- The District of Epping Forest (Electoral Arrangements) Order 1977 (SI 1977/1415)
- The London Borough of Barking (Electoral Arrangements) Order 1977 (SI 1977/1427)
- The Borough of Crawley (Electoral Arrangements) Order 1977 (SI 1977/1433)
- The District of North Hertfordshire (Electoral Arrangements) Order 1977 (SI 1977/1442)
- Administration of Justice Act 1977 (Commencement No. 2) Order 1977 (SI 1977/1490)

=== 1500-1999 ===
==== 1500–1599 ====
- Social Security (Miscellaneous Amendments) Regulations 1977 (SI 1977/1509)
- The London Borough of Havering (Electoral Arrangements) Order 1977 (SI 1977/1545)
- The London Borough of Redbridge (Electoral Arrangements) Order 1977 (SI 1977/1546)
- The London Borough of Croydon (Electoral Arrangements) Order 1977 (SI 1977/1564)
- The London Borough of Hammersmith (Electoral Arrangements) Order 1977 (SI 1977/1565)
- The London Borough of Richmond upon Thames (Electoral Arrangements) Order 1977 (SI 1977/1567)
- The London Borough of Islington (Electoral Arrangements) Order 1977 (SI 1977/1577)
- The Royal Borough of Kingston upon Thames (Electoral Arrangements) Order 1977 (SI 1977/1588)
- Administration of Justice Act 1977 (Commencement No. 3) Order 1977 (SI 1977/1589)

==== 1600–1699 ====
- The London Borough of Newham (Electoral Arrangements) Order 1977 (SI 1977/1613)
- The London Borough of Hillingdon (Electoral Arrangements) Order 1977 (SI 1977/1673)
- The District of Richmondshire (Electoral Arrangements) Order 1977 (SI 1977/1674)
- Criminal Law Act 1977 (Commencement No. 3) Order 1977 (SI 1977/1682) (C.58)
- The Orkney Islands Area (Electoral Arrangements) Order 1977 (SI 1977/1697)
- The Western Isles Islands Area (Electoral Arrangements) Order 1977 (SI 1977/1698)

==== 1700–1799 ====
- Police Pensions (Amendment) Regulations 1977 (SI 1977/1705)
- Abergwili and Llanpumsaint Light Railway Order 1977 (SI 1977/1741)
- Alcoholometers and Alcohol Hydrometers (EEC Requirements) Regulations 1977 (SI 1977/1753)
- Legal Advice and Assistance (Scotland) Amendment Regulations 1977 (SI 1977/1762)
- The London Borough of Bexley (Electoral Arrangements) Order 1977 (SI 1977/1763)
- The London Borough of Greenwich (Electoral Arrangements) Order 1977 (SI 1977/1764)
- The London Borough of Hackney (Electoral Arrangements) Order 1977 (SI 1977/1765)
- The London Borough of Waltham Forest (Electoral Arrangements) Order 1977 (SI 1977/1766)

==== 1800–1899 ====
- The London Borough of Brent (Electoral Arrangements) Order 1977 (SI 1977/1810)
- The District of North Kesteven (Electoral Arrangements) Order 1977 (SI 1977/1811)
- The London Borough of Barnet (Electoral Arrangements) Order 1977 (SI 1977/1817)
- The Royal Borough of Kensington and Chelsea (Electoral Arrangements) Order 1977 (SI 1977/1818)
- The London Borough of Merton (Electoral Arrangements) Order 1977 (SI 1977/1819)
- Judicial Pensions (Requisite Benefits) Order 1977 (SI 1977/1858)
- The London Borough of Camden (Electoral Arrangements) Order 1977 (SI 1977/1864)
- The District of Rutland (Electoral Arrangements) Order 1977 (SI 1977/1865)
- The City of Oxford (Electoral Arrangements) Order 1977 (SI 1977/1885)
- The Borough of Gravesham (Electoral Arrangements) Order 1977 (SI 1977/1894)
- The Borough of High Peak (Electoral Arrangements) Order 1977 (SI 1977/1895)

==== 1900–1999 ====
- Torts (Interference with Goods) Act 1977 (Commencement No. 1) Order 1977 (SI 1977/1910)
- Industrial Training (Transfer of the Activities of Establishments) Order 1977 (SI 1977/1951)
- The London Borough of Wandsworth (Electoral Arrangements) Order 1977 (SI 1977/1962)
- The Fife Region (Electoral Arrangements) Order 1977 (SI 1977/1983)
- The Central Region (Electoral Arrangements) Order 1977 (SI 1977/1984)
- The Borders Region (Electoral Arrangements) Order 1977 (SI 1977/1985)
- The Dumfries and Galloway Region (Electoral Arrangements) Order 1977 (SI 1977/1986)

=== 2000-2499 ===
==== 2000–2099 ====
- District of South Staffordshire (Electoral Arrangements) Order 1977 (SI 1977/2037)
- London Borough of Haringey (Electoral Arrangements) Order 1977 (SI 1977/2067)
- London Borough of Lambeth (Electoral Arrangements) Order 1977 (SI 1977/2068)
- Land Registration Rules 1977 (SI 1977/2089)

==== 2100–2199 ====
- Judicial Pensions (Preservation of Benefits) (No. 2) Order 1977 (SI 1977/2102)
- Medicines Act 1968 (Commencement No. 7) Order 1977 (SI 1977/2128)
- London Borough of Bromley (Electoral Arrangements) Order 1977 (SI 1977/2141)
- Agricultural Wages (Regulation) (Northern Ireland) Order 1977 (SI 1977/2151) (N.I. 22)
- Supplementary Benefits (Northern Ireland) Order 1977 (SI 1977/2156) (N.I. 27)
- Rates (Northern Ireland) Order 1977 (SI 1977/2157) (N.I. 28)
- Police Pensions (Amendment) (No. 2) Regulations 1977 (SI 1977/2173)
- Judicial Pensions (Preservation of Benefits) (Amendment) Order 1977 (SI 1977/2185)

==== 2200–2299 ====
- Administration of Justice Act 1977 (Commencement No. 4) Order 1977 (SI 1977/2202)

== See also ==
- List of statutory instruments of the United Kingdom
