= Court of the clerk of the market =

Former English court

A court of the clerk of the market was an inferior court held at every market for the punishment of minor crimes, and to exercise control over market prices and over weights and measures. These courts were presided over by the relevant clerk of the market.

It was listed by Edward Coke in Institutes of the Lawes of England as a type of public court of criminal jurisdiction, and also included by William Blackstone in his Commentaries on the Laws of England:

The court of the clerk of the market is incident to every fair and market in the kingdom, to punish misdemeanors therein; as a court of pie poudre is, to determine all disputes relating to private or civil property. The object of this jurisdiction is principally the cognizance of weights and measures, to try whether they be according to the true standard thereof, or no: which standard was anciently committed to the custody of the bishop, who appointed some clerk under him to inspect the abuse of them more narrowly; and hence this officer, though now usually a layman, is called the clerk of the market. If they be not according to the standard, then, besides the punishment of the party by fine, the weights and measures themselves ought to be burnt. This is the most inferior court of criminal jurisdiction in the kingdom; though the objects of its coercion were esteemed among the Romans of such importance to the public, that they were committed to the care of some of their most dignified magistrates, the curule aediles.

— Commentaries on the Laws of England
