= Court of Hustings =

The Court of Hustings is a court that sat at the Guildhall in the City of London. It is believed to be the oldest court in the City of London and had the jurisdiction of a county court. Whilst the court has not been abolished, it no longer sits and retains no jurisdiction to hear and determine cases, although it retains the power to enrol wills and deeds.

The court was responsible for some administrative business that eventually became the separate Court of Aldermen.

The Royal Commission on the City of London recommended the abolition of the court and the Court of Hustings (London) Abolition Bill was promoted in 1871. The bill was not passed and the court still exists as a preserved jurisdiction without authority under the Administration of Justice Act 1977 schedules.
