= List of statutory instruments of the United Kingdom, 1993 =

This is a complete list of all 1,844 statutory instruments published in the United Kingdom in the year 1993.

== Statutory instruments ==
=== 1-499 ===
==== 1–99 ====
- Environmental Protection (Controls on Injurious Substances) Regulations 1993 (S.I. 1993/1)
- Rail Crossing Extinguishment and Diversion Orders Regulations 1993 (S.I. 1993/9)
- Town and Country Planning (Public Path Orders) Regulations 1993 (S.I. 1993/10)
- Public Path Orders Regulations 1993 (S.I. 1993/11)
- Wildlife and Countryside (Definitive Maps and Statements) Regulations 1993 (S.I. 1993/12)
- Food Protection (Emergency Prohibitions) (Radioactivity in Sheep) Partial Revocation Order 1993 (S.I. 1993/13)
- Animals (Post-Import Control) Order 1993 (S.I. 1993/14)
- Genetically Modified Organisms (Contained Use) Regulations 1993 (S.I. 1993/15)
- Friendly Societies Act 1992 (Commencement No. 3 and Transitional Provisions) Order 1993 (S.I. 1993/16)
- Food Protection (Emergency Prohibitions) (Oil and Chemical Pollution of Fish) Order 1993 (S.I. 1993/17)
- Wireless Telegraphy Apparatus (Land Mobile-Satellite Service) (Low Bit Rate Data) (Exemption) Regulations 1993 (S.I. 1993/21)
- Local Government Finance (Miscellaneous Provisions) (England) Order 1993 (S.I. 1993/22)
- Lanarkshire (Hamilton) Enterprise Zones Designation Order 1993 (S.I. 1993/23)
- Lanarkshire (Motherwell) Enterprise Zones Designation Order 1993 (S.I. 1993/24)
- Lanarkshire (Monklands) Enterprise Zones Designation Order 1993 (S.I. 1993/25)
- Mayday Healthcare National Health Service Trust (Establishment) Order 1993 (S.I. 1993/27)
- Warrington Hospital National Health Service Trust (Establishment) Order 1993 (S.I. 1993/28)
- West Midlands Ambulance Service National Health Service Trust (Establishment) Order 1993 (S.I. 1993/29)
- Income Support (General) Amendment Regulations 1993 (S.I. 1993/30)
- Motor Vehicles (Wearing of Seat Belts by Children in Front Seats) Regulations 1993 (S.I. 1993/31)
- Food Protection (Emergency Prohibitions) (Radioactivity in Sheep) (Wales) (Partial Revocation) Order 1993 (S.I. 1993/32)
- Food Protection (Emergency Prohibitions) (Radioactivity in Sheep) (England) (Partial Revocation) Order 1993 (S.I. 1993/33)
- North West London Mental Health National Health Service Trust (Establishment) Order 1993 (S.I. 1993/34)
- Road Traffic Regulation Act 1984 (Amendment) Order 1993 (S.I. 1993/35)
- Local Authorities (Discretionary Expenditure) (Relevant Population) Regulations 1993 (S.I. 1993/40)
- Local Authorities (Discretionary Expenditure Limits) Order 1993 (S.I. 1993/41)
- Control of Pollution (Anglers' Lead Weights) (Amendment) Regulations 1993 (S.I. 1993/49)
- Gipsy Encampments (London Borough of Bromley) Order 1993 (S.I. 1993/50)
- Licensed Betting Offices (Amendment) Regulations 1993 (S.I. 1993/51)
- Combined Probation Areas (Powys) Order 1993 (S.I. 1993/52)
- National Rivers Authority (Anglian Region) (Reconstitution of the Alford Drainage Board) Order 1992 S.I. 1993/53)
- National Rivers Authority (Anglian Region) (Reconstruction of the North East Lindsey Internal Drainage Board) Order 1992 S.I. 1993/54)
- National Rivers Authority (Anglian Region) (Reconstitution of the Louth Drainage Board) Order 1992 S.I. 1993/55)
- Education (Higher Education Corporations) (Wales) (No. 3) Order 1993 (S.I. 1993/56)
- Friendly Societies (Group Schemes) Regulations 1993 (S.I. 1993/59)
- Friendly Societies (Qualifications of Actuaries) Regulations 1993 (S.I. 1993/60)
- National Rivers Authority (Levies) Regulations 1993 (S.I. 1993/61)
- A23 Trunk Road (Brighton Road, Croydon) (Box Junction) Order 1993 (S.I. 1993/62)
- Drivers' Hours (Passenger and Goods Vehicles) (Exemption) Regulations 1993 (S.I. 1993/66)
- Community Drivers' Hours (Passenger and Goods Vehicles) (Temporary Exception) Regulations 1993 (S.I. 1993/67)
- Licensed Betting Offices (Amendment) Scotland Regulations 1993 (S.I. 1993/68)
- Merchant Shipping (Navigational Equipment) Regulations 1993 (S.I. 1993/69)
- Hill Livestock (Compensatory Allowances) (Amendment) Regulations 1993 (S.I. 1993/70)
- Combined Probation Areas (Cornwall) Order 1993 (S.I. 1993/71)
- Education (Training Grants) Regulations 1993 (S.I. 1993/72)
- Copyright (Recording for Archives of Designated Class of Broadcasts and Cable Programmes) (Designated Bodies) Order 1993 (S.I. 1993/74)
- Housing Revenue Account General Fund Contribution Limits (Scotland) Order 1993 (S.I. 1993/75)
- A435 Trunk Road (Alcester to Gorcott Hill) De-Trunking Order 1993 (S.I. 1993/80)
- A435 Trunk Road (Studley Bypass and Slip Roads) Order 1993 (S.I. 1993/81)
- Environmentally Sensitive Areas (North Kent Marshes) Designation Order 1993 (S.I. 1993/82)
- Environmentally Sensitive Areas (Exmoor) Designation Order 1993 (S.I. 1993/83)
- Environmentally Sensitive Areas (Avon Valley) Designation Order 1993 (S.I. 1993/84)
- Environmentally Sensitive Areas (Lake District) Designation Order 1993 (S.I. 1993/85)
- Environmentally Sensitive Areas (South Wessex Downs) Designation Order 1993 (S.I. 1993/86)
- Environmentally Sensitive Areas (South West Peak) Designation Order 1993 (S.I. 1993/87)
- A23 Trunk Road (London Road, Croydon) (Prescribed Routes) Order 1993 (S.I. 1993/88)
- Higher Education (Wales) (Revocation) Regulations 1993 (S.I. 1993/89)
- Combined Probation Areas (Amendment) Order 1993 (S.I. 1993/92)
- Education (Further Education Corporations) Order 1993 (S.I. 1993/97)
- Friendly Societies (Insurance Business) Regulations 1993 (S.I. 1993/98)
- Friendly Societies (Authorisation) Regulations 1993 (S.I. 1993/99)

==== 100–199 ====
- Air Fares (Amendment) Regulations 1993 (S.I. 1993/100)
- Licensing of Air Carriers (Amendment) Regulations 1993 (S.I. 1993/101)
- Local Government and Housing Act 1989 (Commencement No. 15) Order 1993 (S.I. 1993/105)
- Education (School Financial Statements) (Prescribed Particulars etc.) Regulations 1993 (S.I. 1993/113)
- Teachers' Superannuation (Amendment) Regulations 1993 (S.I. 1993/114)
- British Railways (Penalty Fares) Act 1989 (Activating No. 8) Order 1993 (S.I. 1993/115)
- A31 Trunk Road (Ashley Heath Grade Separated Junction) Order 1993 (S.I. 1993/116)
- Local Government Act 1988 (Defined Activities) (Exemption) (Boothferry Borough Council) Order 1993 (S.I. 1993/117)
- Act of Sederunt (Fees of Messengers-at-Arms) 1993 (S.I. 1993/118)
- Value Added Tax (General) (Amendment) Regulations 1993 (S.I. 1993/119)
- Act of Sederunt (Fees of Sheriff Officers) 1993 (S.I. 1993/120)
- Testing in Primary Schools (Scotland) Revocation Regulations 1993 (S.I. 1993/121)
- East Birmingham Hospital National Health Service Trust (Change of Name) Order 1993 (S.I. 1993/122)
- Teddington Memorial Hospital National Health Service Trust (Establishment) Order 1993 (S.I. 1993/123)
- Revenue Support Grant (Specified Bodies) (Amendment) Regulations 1993 (S.I. 1993/139)
- A35 Trunk Road (40 mph Speed Limit) Order 2003 (S.I. 1993/142)
- Food Protection (Emergency Prohibitions) (Oil and Chemical Pollution of Fish) (No.2) Order 1993 (S.I. 1993/143)
- Council Tax (Additional Provisions for Discount Disregards) (Amendment) Regulations 1993 (S.I. 1993/149)
- Council Tax (Exempt Dwellings) (Amendment) Order 1993 (S.I. 1993/150)
- Council Tax (Liability for Owners) (Amendment) Regulations 1993 (S.I. 1993/151)
- Genetically Modified Organisms (Deliberate Release) Regulationa 1993 (S.I. 1993/152)
- Barnsley Community and Priority Services National Health Service Trust (Transfer of Trust Property) Order 1993 (S.I. 1993/153)
- Mersey Regional Ambulance Service National Health Service Trust (Transfer of Trust Property) Order 1993 (S.I. 1993/154)
- North Mersey Community National Health Service Trust (Establishment) Amendment Order 1993 (S.I. 1993/155)
- Shropshire's Mental Health National Health Service Trust (Establishment) Amendment Order 1993 (S.I. 1993/156)
- Thameside Community Health Care National Health Service Trust (Change of Name) Order 1993 (S.I. 1993/157)
- Drivers' Hours (Passenger and Goods Vehicles) (Exemption) (Revocation) Regulations 1993 (S.I. 1993/158)
- Manchester Central Hospitals and Community Care National Health Service Trust (Change of Name) Order 1993 (S.I. 1993/159)
- A30 and A39 Trunk Roads (Indian Queens, Fraddon and St Columb Road Bypasses and Slip Roads) Order 1993 (S.I. 1993/163)
- A30 and A39 Trunk Roads (Indian Queens, Fraddon and St Columb Road Bypasses) (Detrunking) Order 1993 (S.I. 1993/164)
- General Drainage Charges (Relevant Quotient) Regulations 1993 (S.I. 1993/165)
- Central Rating Lists (Amendment) Regulations 1993 (S.I. 1993/166)
- Spring Traps Approval (Scotland) Variation Order 1993 (S.I. 1993/167)
- Humberside and South Yorkshire (County Boundaries) Order 1993 (S.I. 1993/168)
- Special Road Schemes and Highways Orders (Procedure) Regulations 1993 (S.I. 1993/169)
- Combined Probation Areas (Kent) Order 1993 (S.I. 1993/173)
- Insurance Companies (Amendment) Regulations 1993 (S.I. 1993/174)
- Council Tax (Transitional Reduction Scheme) (England) Regulations 1993 (S.I. 1993/175)
- Motor Vehicles (Wearing of Seat Belts) Regulations 1993 (S.I. 1993/176)
- Loch Crinan Scallops Fishery Order 1993 (S.I. 1993/177)
- Local Government Act 1988 (Defined Activities) (Specified Periods) (Scotland) Amendment Regulations 1993 (S.I. 1993/178)
- Air Navigation (Dangerous Goods) (Fourth Amendment) Regulations 1992 S.I. 1993/179)
- City of London (Non-Domestic Rating Multiplier) Order 1993 (S.I. 1993/180)
- Sea Fish Licensing (Variation) Order 1993 (S.I. 1993/188)
- Spring Traps Approval (Variation) Order 1993 (S.I. 1993/189)
- New Severn Bridge (Restriction of Navigation) Regulations 1993 (S.I. 1993/190)
- Council Tax and Non-Domestic Rating (Demand Notices) (England) Regulations 1993 (S.I. 1993/191)
- Value Added Tax Act 1983 (Interest on Overpayments etc.) (Prescribed Rate) Order 1993 (S.I. 1993/192)
- Copyright (Certification of Licensing Scheme for Educational Recording of Broadcasts and Cable Programmes) (Educational Recording Agency Limited) (Amendment) Order 1993 (S.I. 1993/193)
- Local Government Finance Act 1992 (Commencement No. 7 and Amendment) Order 1993 (S.I. 1993/194)
- Council Tax (Reductions for Disabilities) (Amendment) Regulations 1993 (S.I. 1993/195)
- Council Tax (Administration and Enforcement) (Amendment) Regulations 1993 (S.I. 1993/196)
- Friendly Societies Act 1992 (Commencement No. 4) Order 1993 (S.I. 1993/197)
- St Vincent's Home Instrument of Management (Variation) Order 1993 (S.I. 1993/198)
- Protection of Wrecks (MV Braer) Order 1993 (S.I. 1993/199)

==== 200–299 ====
- Local Authorities (Standing Orders) Regulations 1993 (S.I. 1993/202)
- Furniture and Furnishings (Fire) (Safety) (Amendment) Regulations 1993 (S.I. 1993/207)
- Coal and Other Safety-Lamp Mines (Explosives) Regulations 1993 (S.I. 1993/208)
- Poultry Meat (Hygiene) (Amendment) Regulations 1993 (S.I. 1993/209)
- Liverpool Housing Action Trust (Area and Constitution) Order 1993 Approved by both Houses of Parliament S.I. 1993/210)
- Education (Designated Institutions in Further Education) (Wales) Order 1993 (S.I. 1993/215)
- Non-Domestic Rates (Scotland) Order 1993 (S.I. 1993/216)
- Superannuation (Children's Pensions) (Earnings Limit) Order 1993 (S.I. 1993/220)
- Insolvency Practitioners (Amendment) Regulations 1993 (S.I. 1993/221)
- Taxes (Interest Rate) (Amendment) Regulations 1993 (S.I. 1993/222)
- Drainage Rates (Forms) Regulations 1993 (S.I. 1993/223)
- Foreign Compensation (Financial Provisions) Order 1993 (S.I. 1993/224)
- Aircraft and Shipbuilding Industries (Repeals) (Northern Ireland) Order 1992 S.I. 1993/225)
- District Electoral Areas (Northern Ireland) Order 1993 (S.I. 1993/226)
- Parliamentary Constituencies (Wales) (Miscellaneous Changes) Order 1993 (S.I. 1993/227)
- Academic Awards and Distinctions (Queen Margaret College) (Scotland) Order of Council 1993 (S.I. 1993/230)
- Air Navigation (Third Amendment) Order 1993 (S.I. 1993/231)
- Local Government Finance Act 1992 (Community Charge Benefit) Savings and Transitional Order 1993 (S.I. 1993/232)
- Funds for Trade Union Ballots Regulations (Revocation) Regulations 1993 (S.I. 1993/233)
- Non-Domestic Rates (Levying) (Scotland) Regulations 1993 (S.I. 1993/234)
- Poultry Meat (Hygiene) (Scotland) Amendment Regulations 1993 (S.I. 1993/235)
- Finance (No. 2) Act 1992, Schedule 9, (Appointed Day) Order 1993 (S.I. 1993/236)
- Criminal Justice Act 1988 (Application to Service Courts) (Evidence through Television Links) Order 1993 (S.I. 1993/244)
- Police (Promotion) (Scotland) Amendment Regulations 1993 (S.I. 1993/251)
- Non-Domestic Rating (Demand Notices) (Wales) Regulations 1993 (S.I. 1993/252)
- Council Tax (Transitional Reduction Scheme) (England) (Amendment) Regulations 1993 (S.I. 1993/253)
- Rules of the Air (Amendment) Regulations 1993 (S.I. 1993/254)
- Council Tax (Demand Notices) (Wales) Regulations 1993 (S.I. 1993/255)
- Valuation Timetable (Scotland) Amendment Order 1993 (S.I. 1993/256)
- Salmon (Definition of Methods of Net Fishing and Construction of Nets) (Scotland) Amendment Regulations 1993 (S.I. 1993/257)
- A417 Trunk Road (Brockworth Bypass and Slip Roads) Order 1993 (S.I. 1993/259)
- Social Security (Contributions) Amendment Regulations 1993 (S.I. 1993/260)
- A417 Trunk Road (Brockworth Bypass and Slip Roads) (Detrunking) Order 1993 (S.I. 1993/261)
- M5 Motorway (Brockworth Bypass and Slip Roads) (Slip Roads, Special Roads) Scheme 1993 (S.I. 1993/262)
- Industrial Training Levy (Construction Board) Order 1993 (S.I. 1993/265)
- Industrial Training Levy (Engineering Construction Board) Order 1993 (S.I. 1993/266)
- A4 Trunk Road (Reading Eastern Boundary to Maidenhead Thicket) Detrunking Order 1993 (S.I. 1993/267)
- Local Government Act 1988 (Defined Activities) (Specified Period) (Woking Borough Council) Regulations 1993 (S.I. 1993/268)
- Education (Further Education Corporations) Order 1993 (S.I. 1993/269)
- Education (St Austell Sixth Form College and Mid-Cornwall College) (Dissolution) Order 1993 (S.I. 1993/270)
- St Austell College (Government) Regulations 1993 (S.I. 1993/271)
- Hereford and Worcester and Warwickshire (County Boundaries) Order 1993 (S.I. 1993/272)
- Housing and Planning Act 1986 (Commencement No. 18 and Transitional Provisions) (Scotland) Order 1993 (S.I. 1993/273)
- Environmental Protection Act 1990 (Commencement No. 13) Order 1993 (S.I. 1993/274)
- Planning and Compensation Act 1991 (Commencement No. 15) (Scotland) Order 1993 (S.I. 1993/275)
- River Tay Catchment Area Protection (Renewal) Order 1993 (S.I. 1993/276)
- Council Tax (Transitional Reduction Scheme) (Scotland) Regulations 1993 (S.I. 1993/277)
- Removal and Disposal of Vehicles (Amendment) Regulations 1993 (S.I. 1993/278)
- Guaranteed Minimum Pensions Increase Order 1993 (S.I. 1993/279)
- Social Security (Contributions) (Re-rating) Order 1993 (S.I. 1993/280)
- Social Security (Contributions) Amendment (No. 2) Regulations 1993 (S.I. 1993/281)
- Social Security (Contributions) Amendment (No. 3) Regulations 1993 (S.I. 1993/282)
- A63 Trunk Road (Selby Bypass) Order 1993 (S.I. 1993/286)
- A1041 Trunk Road (The Crescent to Brayton Lane) (De-trunking) Order 1993 (S.I. 1993/287)
- A63 Trunk Road (Whinny Hagg Lane to Magazine Road) (De-trunking) Order 1993 (S.I. 1993/288)
- National Health Service Trusts (Originating Capital Debt) Order 1993 (S.I. 1993/289)
- Council Tax (Alteration of Lists and Appeals) Regulations 1993 (S.I. 1993/290)
- Non-Domestic Rating (Alteration of Lists and Appeals) Regulations 1993 (S.I. 1993/291)
- Valuation and Community Charge Tribunals (Amendment) Regulations 1993 (S.I. 1993/292)
- A65 Trunk Road (Manor Park Improvement) Order 1993 (S.I. 1993/293)
- A65 Trunk Road (Denton Bridge to Black Bull Farm) (De-Trunking) Order 1993 (S.I. 1993/294)
- Family Proceedings (Amendment) Rules 1993 (S.I. 1993/295)
- Lands Tribunal for Scotland (Amendment) (Fees) Rules 1993 (S.I. 1993/296)
- Scottish Land Court (Fees) Order 1993 (S.I. 1993/297)
- Lyon Court and Office Fees (Variation) Order 1993 (S.I. 1993/298)

==== 300–399 ====
- Goods Vehicles (Operators' Licences, Qualifications and Fees) (Amendment) Regulations 1993 (S.I. 1993/301)
- Mines (Shafts and Winding) Regulations 1993 (S.I. 1993/302)
- Housing (Right to Buy) (Priority of Charges) Order 1993 (S.I. 1993/303)
- Mortgage Indemnities (Recognised Bodies) Order 1993 (S.I. 1993/304)
- Folkestone-Brighton-Southampton-Dorchester-Honiton Trunk Road (Guestling Thorn Diversion) (Revocation) Order 1993 (S.I. 1993/305)
- Local Authorities (Capital Finance) (Rate of Discount for 1993/94) Regulations 1993 (S.I. 1993/312)
- Police (Amendment) Regulations 1993 (S.I. 1993/313)
- Gipsy Encampments (City and District of St. Albans) Order 1993 (S.I. 1993/314)
- Income-related Benefits Schemes (Miscellaneous Amendments) Regulations 1993 (S.I. 1993/315)
- Social Security (Invalid Care Allowance) Amendment Regulations 1993 (S.I. 1993/316)
- Housing Benefit (General) Amendment Regulations 1993 (S.I. 1993/317)
- Humberside Ambulance Service National Health Service Trust (Establishment) Amendment Order 1993 TI> S.I. 1993/318)
- Maidstone Priority Care National Health Service Trust (Establishment) Amendment Order 1993 (S.I. 1993/319)
- Royal Bournemouth and Christchurch Hospitals National Health Service Trust (Transfer of Trust Property) Order 1993 (S.I. 1993/320)
- Caledonian MacBrayne Limited (Armadale) Harbour Revision Order 1992 S.I. 1993/321)
- Revenue Support Grant (Scotland) Order 1993 (S.I. 1993/322)
- Town and Country Planning (Hazardous Substances) (Scotland) Regulations 1993 (S.I. 1993/323)
- A23 Trunk Road (Streatham High Road, Lambeth) (Box Junction) Order 1993 (S.I. 1993/335)
- Southport and Formby National Health Service Trust (Transfer of Trust Property) Order 1993 (S.I. 1993/336)
- Bassetlaw Hospital and Community Services National Health Service Trust (Transfer of Trust Property) Order 1993 (S.I. 1993/337)
- Dorset Healthcare National Health Service Trust (Transfer of Trust Property) Order 1993 (S.I. 1993/338)
- Southmead Health Services National Health Service Trust (Transfer of Trust Property) Order 1993 (S.I. 1993/339)
- Central Region (Electoral Arrangements) Order 1993 (S.I. 1993/340)
- Local Government Finance (Scotland) Order 1993 (S.I. 1993/341)
- Council Tax (Discounts) (Scotland) Amendment Regulations 1993 (S.I. 1993/342)
- Council Tax (Discounts) (Scotland) Amendment Order 1993 (S.I. 1993/343)
- Council Tax (Liability of Owners) (Scotland) Amendment Regulations 1993 (S.I. 1993/344)
- Council Tax (Exempt Dwellings) (Scotland) Amendment Order 1993 (S.I. 1993/345)
- Consumer Credit (Exempt Agreements) (Amendment) Order 1993 (S.I. 1993/346)
- Training for Work (Miscellaneous Provisions) Order 1993 (S.I. 1993/348)
- Social Security Benefits Up-rating Order 1993 (S.I. 1993/349)
- Statutory Sick Pay (Rate of Payment) Order 1993 (S.I. 1993/350)
- Poole Hospital National Health Service Trust (Transfer of Trust Property) Order 1993 (S.I. 1993/351)
- St George's Healthcare National Health Service Trust (Establishment) Order 1993 (S.I. 1993/352)
- Chester and Halton Community National Health Service Trust (Transfer of Trust Property) Order 1993 (S.I. 1993/353)
- Council Tax (Valuation of Dwellings) (Scotland) Amendment Regulations 1993 (S.I. 1993/354)
- Council Tax (Alteration of Lists and Appeals) (Scotland) Regulations 1993 (S.I. 1993/355)
- Poultry Laying Flocks (Testing and Registration etc.) (Revocation) Order 1993 (S.I. 1993/357)
- A249 Trunk Road (M2 to Bobbing Improvement) Order 1993 (S.I. 1993/360)
- A249 Trunk Road (M2 to Bobbing Improvement Slip Roads) Order 1993 (S.I. 1993/361)
- A249 Trunk Road (M2 to Bobbing Improvement Detrunking) Order 1993 (S.I. 1993/362)
- M66 Motorway (Manchester Outer Ring Road, Denton to Middleton Section) A663 Broadway All-Purpose Connecting Road Order 1993 (S.I. 1993/363)
- M66 Motorway (Manchester Outer Ring Road, Denton to Middleton Section) and Connecting Roads Scheme 1988 Amendment Scheme 1993 (S.I. 1993/364)
- Local Government Act 1988 (Defined Activities) (Exemption) (Greater Manchester Fire and Civil Defence Authority) Order 1993 (S.I. 1993/365)
- Local Government Superannuation (Amendment) Regulations 1993 (S.I. 1993/366)
- Probation (Amendment) Rules 1993 (S.I. 1993/367)
- Criminal Justice Act 1991 (Contracted Out Prisons) Order 1993 (S.I. 1993/368)
- Scottish Hospital Trust Scheme 1993 (S.I. 1993/372)
- Registration of Births, Deaths and Marriages (Fees) (Amendment) Order 1993 (S.I. 1993/377)
- Cheshire, Lancashire and Merseyside (County Boundaries) Order 1993 (S.I. 1993/378)
- Norfolk and Suffolk Broads (Extension of Byelaws) Order 1993 (S.I. 1993/379)
- Defence Research Agency Trading Fund Order 1993 (S.I. 1993/380)
- Sea Fishing (Enforcement of Community Quota Measures) Order 1993 (S.I. 1993/387)
- Derbyshire and South Yorkshire (County and District Boundaries) Order 1993 (S.I. 1993/393)
- Cheshire and Merseyside (County and Metropolitan Borough Boundaries) Order 1993 (S.I. 1993/394)
- Sugar Beet (Research and Education) Order 1993 (S.I. 1993/397)
- A140 Trunk Road (Scole – Dickleburgh Improvement) Order 1993 (S.I. 1993/398)
- A140 Trunk Road (Scole – Dickleburgh Improvement) Detrunking Order 1993 (S.I. 1993/399)

==== 400–499 ====
- Greater London, Kent and Surrey (County Boundaries) Order 1993 (S.I. 1993/400)
- Billing Authorities (Alteration of Requisite Calculations and Transitional Reduction Scheme) (England) Regulations 1993 (S.I. 1993/401)
- Staffordshire, Warwickshire and West Midlands (County Boundaries) Order 1993 (S.I. 1993/402)
- Education (Designated Institutions) Order 1993 (S.I. 1993/404)
- Organic Products (Amendment) Regulations 1993 (S.I. 1993/405)
- Outer Space Act 1986 (Fees) (Amendment) Regulations 1993 (S.I. 1993/406)
- Local Authorities (Recovery of Costs for Public Path Orders) Regulations 1993 (S.I. 1993/407)
- Social Security (Introduction of Disability Living Allowance) (Amendment) Regulations 1993 (S.I. 1993/408)
- National Health Service Trusts (Membership and Procedure) (Scotland) Amendment Regulations 1993 (S.I. 1993/412)
- National Health Service Trusts (Originating Capital Debt) Order 1993 (S.I. 1993/413)
- Lloyd's Underwriters (Tax) (1990–91) Regulations 1993 (S.I. 1993/415)
- Seeds (National Lists of Varieties) (Fees) (Amendment) Regulations 1993 (S.I. 1993/416)
- National Health Service (Optical Charges and Payments) Amendment Regulations 1993 (S.I. 1993/418)
- National Health Service (Dental Charges) Amendment Regulations 1993 (S.I. 1993/419)
- National Health Service (Charges for Drugs and Appliances) Amendment Regulations 1993 (S.I. 1993/420)
- Finance Act 1985 (Interest on Tax) (Prescribed Rate) Order 1993 (S.I. 1993/421)
- Workmen's Compensation (Supplementation) (Amendment) Scheme 1993 (S.I. 1993/422)
- Glasgow Caledonian University (Establishment) (Scotland) Order 1993 (S.I. 1993/423)
- Designation of Institutions of Higher Education (Scotland) Amendment Order 1993 (S.I. 1993/424)
- High Court of Justiciary Fees Amendment Order 1993 (S.I. 1993/426)
- Court of Session etc. Fees Amendment Order 1993 (S.I. 1993/427)
- Sheriff Court Fees Amendment Order 1993 (S.I. 1993/428)
- Seeds (Fees) (Amendment) Regulations 1993 (S.I. 1993/429)
- Plant Breeders' Rights (Fees) (Amendment) Regulations 1993 (S.I. 1993/430)
- Education (PCFC and UFC Staff) Order 1993 (S.I. 1993/434)
- Education (Designated Institutions in Further Education) Order 1993 (S.I. 1993/435)
- Cheshire, Greater Manchester, Lancashire and Merseyside (County and District Boundaries) Order 1993 (S.I. 1993/436)
- Hereford and Worcester, Warwickshire and West Midlands (County and Metropolitan Borough Boundaries) Order 1993 (S.I. 1993/437)
- Bankruptcy (Scotland) Act 1993 Commencement and Savings Order 1993 (S.I. 1993/438)
- Bankruptcy (Scotland) Amendment Regulations 1993 (S.I. 1993/439)
- Essex, Greater London and Hertfordshire (County and London Borough Boundaries) Order 1993 (S.I. 1993/441)
- Derbyshire and Nottinghamshire (County Boundaries) Order 1993 (S.I. 1993/444)
- Environmental Protection (Waste Recycling Payments) (Amendment) Regulations 1993 (S.I. 1993/445)
- National Rivers Authority (Severn-Trent Region) (Reconstitution of the South Gloucestershire Internal Drainage Board) Order 1992 S.I. 1993/451)
- Alteration of Boundaries of the Beverley and North Holderness Internal Drainage District Order 1993 (S.I. 1993/452)
- Reconstitution of the South Holland Internal Drainage Board Order 1993 (S.I. 1993/453)
- National Rivers Authority (Anglian Region) (Reconstitution of the North Level Internal Drainage Board) Order 1992 S.I. 1993/454)
- Environmentally Sensitive Areas (Breckland) Designation Order 1993 (S.I. 1993/455)
- Environmentally Sensitive Areas (Clun) Designation Order 1993 (S.I. 1993/456)
- Environmentally Sensitive Areas (North Peak) Designation Order 1993 (S.I. 1993/457)
- Environmentally Sensitive Areas (Suffolk River Valleys) Designation Order 1993 (S.I. 1993/458)
- Environmentally Sensitive Areas (Test Valley) Designation Order 1993 (S.I. 1993/459)
- Environmentally Sensitive Areas (Pennine Dales) Designation (Amendment) Order 1993 (S.I. 1993/460)
- National Assistance (Sums for Personal Requirements) Regulations 1993 (S.I. 1993/462)
- Education (Further Education Corporations) (Designated Staff) Order 1993 (S.I. 1993/465)
- Bradford, Kirklees and Leeds (City and Metropolitan Borough Boundaries) Order 1993 (S.I. 1993/473)
- Warwickshire and West Midlands (County and District Boundaries) Order 1993 (S.I. 1993/474)
- Merchant Shipping (Light Dues) (Amendment) Regulations 1993 (S.I. 1993/475)
- Wireless Telegraphy (Television Licence Fees) (Amendment) Regulations 1993 (S.I. 1993/476)
- Residential Accommodation (Relevant Premises, Ordinary Residence and Exemptions) Regulations 1993 (S.I. 1993/477)
- Social Security (Claims and Payments) Amendment Regulations 1993 (S.I. 1993/478)
- Social Fund Maternity and Funeral Expenses (General) Amendment Regulations 1993 (S.I. 1993/479)
- Personal Injuries (Civilians) Amendment Scheme 1993 (S.I. 1993/480)
- Education (Prescribed Courses of Higher Education) (Wales) Regulations 1993 (S.I. 1993/481)
- General Optical Council (Registration and Enrolment (Amendment) Rules) Order of Council 1993 (S.I. 1993/483)
- Housing Benefit and Community Charge Benefit (Subsidy) Order 1993 (S.I. 1993/484)
- Housing Benefit and Community Charge Benefit (Subsidy) Amendment Regulations 1993 (S.I. 1993/485)
- Bankruptcy Fees (Scotland) Regulations 1993 (S.I. 1993/486)
- Registered Housing Associations (Accounting Requirements) (Scotland) Order 1993 (S.I. 1993/487)
- National Health Service (Fund-Holding Practices) (Scotland) Regulations 1993 (S.I. 1993/488)
- Grant-aided Colleges (Scotland) Grant Amendment Regulations 1993 (S.I. 1993/489)
- Jordanhill College of Education (Closure) (Scotland) Order 1993 (S.I. 1993/490)
- Banking Act 1987 (Disclosure of Information) (Specified Persons) Order 1993 (S.I. 1993/491)
- Hereford and Worcester, Staffordshire and West Midlands (County and Metropolitan Borough Boundaries) Order 1993 (S.I. 1993/492)
- Cheshire, Derbyshire and Greater Manchester (County and District Boundaries) Order 1993 (S.I. 1993/493)
- Council Tax (Deductions from Income Support) Regulations 1993 (S.I. 1993/494)
- Deductions from Income Support (Miscellaneous Amendment) Regulations 1993 (S.I. 1993/495)
- Pembrokeshire National Health Service Trust (Originating Capital Debt) Order 1993 (S.I. 1993/496)
- Housing Support Grant (Scotland) Order 1993 (S.I. 1993/497)
- Training for Work (Scottish Enterprise and Highlands and Islands Enterprise Programmes) Order 1993 (S.I. 1993/498)
- Civil Aviation (Navigation Services Charges) (Second Amendment) Regulations 1993 (S.I. 1993/499)

=== 500-999 ===
==== 500–599 ====
- Water Supply and Sewerage Services (Customer Service Standards) (Amendment) Regulations 1993 (S.I. 1993/500)
- Local Government Finance Act 1992 (Community Charge Benefits) Saving Order 1993 (S.I. 1993/502)
- Bovine Animals (Identification, Marking and Breeding Records) (Amendment) Order 1993 (S.I. 1993/503)
- Prisoner Escorts Rules 1993 (S.I. 1993/515)
- Prison (Amendment) Rules 1993 (S.I. 1993/516)
- Common Agricultural Policy (Wine) Regulations 1993 (S.I. 1993/517)
- Social Security Benefits (Miscellaneous Amendments) Regulations 1993 (S.I. 1993/518)
- Occupational and Personal Pension Schemes (Miscellaneous Amendments) Regulations 1993 (S.I. 1993/519)
- Local Authorities (Capital Finance) (Amendment) Regulations 1993 (S.I. 1993/520)
- National Health Service (General Medical and Pharmaceutical Services) (Scotland) Amendment Regulations 1993 (S.I. 1993/521)
- National Health Service (Charges for Drugs and Appliances) (Scotland) Amendment Regulations 1993 (S.I. 1993/522)
- National Health Service (Dental Services) (Miscellaneous Amendments) (Scotland) Regulations 1993 (S.I. 1993/523)
- National Health Service (Optical Charges and Payments) (Scotland) Amendment Regulations 1993 (S.I. 1993/524)
- Education (Fees and Awards) (Scotland) Amendment Regulations 1993 (S.I. 1993/525)
- Council Tax (Dwellings) (Scotland) Regulations 1993 (S.I. 1993/526)
- Council Tax (Transitional Reduction Scheme) (Scotland) Amendment (No.2) Regulations 1993 (S.I. 1993/527)
- Legal Aid in Contempt of Court Proceedings (Scotland) Amendment Regulations 1993 (S.I. 1993/528)
- Legal Aid in Contempt of Court Proceedings (Scotland) (Fees) Amendment Regulations 1993 (S.I. 1993/529)
- Criminal Legal Aid (Scotland) (Fees) Amendment Regulations 1993 (S.I. 1993/530)
- Civil Legal Aid (Scotland) (Fees) Amendment Regulations 1993 (S.I. 1993/531)
- Criminal Legal Aid (Scotland) Amendment Regulations 1993 (S.I. 1993/532)
- Advice and Assistance (Scotland) Amendment Regulations 1993 (S.I. 1993/533)
- Legal Aid (Scotland) (Children) Amendment Regulations 1993 (S.I. 1993/534)
- Civil Legal Aid (Scotland) Amendment Regulations 1993 (S.I. 1993/535)
- Misuse of Drugs (Licence Fees) (Amendment) Regulations 1993 (S.I. 1993/539)
- National Health Service (General Medical Services) Amendment Regulations 1993 (S.I. 1993/540)
- Statistics of Trade (Customs and Excise) (Amendment) Regulations 1993 (S.I. 1993/541)
- Non-Domestic Rating (Definition of Domestic Property) Order 1993 (S.I. 1993/542)
- Education (Teachers) Regulations 1993 (S.I. 1993/543)
- Non-Domestic Rating (Miscellaneous Provisions) (No. 2) (Amendment) Regulations 1993 (S.I. 1993/544)
- Local Authorities (Members' Allowances) (Amendment) Regulations 1993 (S.I. 1993/545)
- Building Societies (General Charge and Fees) Regulations 1993 (S.I. 1993/546)
- Friendly Societies (General Charge and Fees) Regulations 1993 (S.I. 1993/547)
- Industrial and Provident Societies (Credit Unions) (Amendment of Fees) Regulations 1993 (S.I. 1993/548)
- Industrial and Provident Societies (Amendment of Fees) Regulations 1993 (S.I. 1993/549)
- Removal, Storage and Disposal of Vehicles (Prescribed Sums and Charges etc.) (Amendment) Regulations 1993 (S.I. 1993/550)
- Housing Renovation etc. Grants (Reduction of Grant) (Amendment) Regulations 1993 (S.I. 1993/551)
- Housing Renovation etc. Grants (Prescribed Forms and Particulars) (Amendment) Regulations 1993 (S.I. 1993/552)
- Housing Renovation etc. Grants (Grant Limit) Order 1993 (S.I. 1993/553)
- Assistance for Minor Works to Dwellings (Amendment) Regulations 1993 (S.I. 1993/554)
- Academic Awards and Distinctions (Glasgow Caledonian University) (Scotland) Order of Council 1993 (S.I. 1993/555)
- Glasgow Caledonian University (Scotland) Order of Council 1993 (S.I. 1993/556)
- Napier University (Scotland) Order of Council 1993 (S.I. 1993/557)
- University of Paisley (Scotland) Order of Council 1993 (S.I. 1993/558)
- Further and Higher Education Act 1992 (Consequential Amendments) Regulations 1993 (S.I. 1993/559)
- Further and Higher Education Act 1992 (Consequential Amendments) Order 1993 (S.I. 1993/560)
- Taxes (Relief for Gifts) (Designated Educational Establishments) (Amendment) Regulations 1993 (S.I. 1993/561)
- Education (Designated Institutions in Further Education) (No. 2) Order 1993 (S.I. 1993/562)
- Education (Designated Institutions in Further and Higher Education) (Interpretation) Order 1993 (S.I. 1993/563)
- Judgment Debts (Rate of Interest) Order 1993 (S.I. 1993/564)
- Civil Legal Aid (General) (Amendment) Regulations 1993 (S.I. 1993/565)
- Controlled Waste (Amendment) Regulations 1993 (S.I. 1993/566)
- National Health Service (Fund-holding Practices) Regulations 1993 (S.I. 1993/567)
- Education (Grant-maintained Schools) (Finance) Regulations 1993 (S.I. 1993/568)
- Education (Grants) (Travellers and Displaced Persons) Regulations 1993 (S.I. 1993/569)
- Isles of Scilly (Community Care) Order 1993 (S.I. 1993/570)
- National Health Service (Determination of Regions) Amendment Order 1993 (S.I. 1993/571)
- National Health Service (District Health Authorities) Order 1993 (S.I. 1993/572)
- Regional and District Health Authorities (Membership and Procedure) Amendment Regulations 1993 (S.I. 1993/573)
- National Health Service (Determination of Districts) Order 1993 (S.I. 1993/574)
- Local Government Finance Act 1992 (Commencement No. 8 and Transitional Provisions) Order 1993 (S.I. 1993/575)
- Local Government Finance (Consequential Amendments) (Scotland) Order 1993 (S.I. 1993/576)
- Scottish Council for Postgraduate Medical and Dental Education Order 1993 (S.I. 1993/577)
- Qualifications of Directors of Social Work (Scotland) Amendment Regulations 1993 (S.I. 1993/578)
- City of Glasgow and Monklands Districts (Bargeddie) Boundaries Amendment Order 1993 (S.I. 1993/579)
- Stirling and Clackmannan Districts (Blackgrange and Blairlogie House) Boundaries Amendment Order 1993 (S.I. 1993/580)
- Housing (Change of Landlord) (Payment of Disposal Cost by Instalments) (Amendment) Regulations 1993 (S.I. 1993/581)
- Residential Accommodation (Determination of District Health Authority) (Amendment) Regulations 1993 (S.I. 1993/582)
- Social Security (Contributions) Amendment (No. 4) Regulations 1993 (S.I. 1993/583)
- Child Support (Northern Ireland Reciprocal Arrangements) Regulations 1993 (S.I. 1993/584)
- National Blood Authority (Establishment and Constitution) Order 1993 (S.I. 1993/585)
- National Blood Authority Regulations 1993 (S.I. 1993/586)
- Central Blood Laboratories Authority (Revocation) Order 1993 (S.I. 1993/587)
- Nurses, Midwives and Health Visitors Act 1992 (Commencement No. 1) Order 1993 (S.I. 1993/588)
- Registration of Births, Deaths and Marriages (Fees) (Amendment) (No. 2) Order 1993 (S.I. 1993/589)
- United Kingdom Central Council for Nursing, Midwifery and Health Visiting (Term of Office of Members) Order 1993 (S.I. 1993/590)
- Recovery of Maintenance (United States of America) Order 1993 (S.I. 1993/591)
- Social Security (Northern Ireland) Order 1993 (S.I. 1993/592)
- Reciprocal Enforcement of Maintenance Orders (Hague Convention Countries) Order 1993 (S.I. 1993/593)
- Reciprocal Enforcement of Maintenance Orders (Republic of Ireland) Order 1993 (S.I. 1993/594)
- European Communities (Designation) Order 1993 (S.I. 1993/595)
- Veterinary Surgeons Qualifications (EEC Recognition) (Amendment) Order 1993 (S.I. 1993/596)
- Home Guard (Amendment) Order 1993 (S.I. 1993/597)
- Naval, Military and Air Forces etc. (Disablement and Death) Service Pensions Amendment Order 1993 (S.I. 1993/598)
- Continental Shelf (Designation of Areas) Order 1993 (S.I. 1993/599)

==== 600–699 ====
- Appropriation (Northern Ireland) Order 1993 (S.I. 1993/600)
- Insurance (Fees) Regulations 1993 (S.I. 1993/601)
- Insolvency (Amendment) Rules 1993 (S.I. 1993/602)
- Civil Jurisdiction and Judgments Act 1982 (Amendment) Order 1993 (S.I. 1993/603)
- Civil Jurisdiction and Judgments (Authentic Instruments and Court Settlements) Order 1993 (S.I. 1993/604)
- Maximum Number of Judges Order 1993 (S.I. 1993/605)
- Maximum Number of Judges (Northern Ireland) Order 1993 (S.I. 1993/606)
- Air Navigation (Fourth Amendment) Order 1993 (S.I. 1993/607)
- National Health Service (Travelling Expenses and Remission of Charges) Amendment Regulations 1993 (S.I. 1993/608)
- Further Education (Attribution of Surpluses and Deficits) Regulations 1993 (S.I. 1993/609)
- Veterinary Surgeons and Veterinary Practitioners (Registration) (Amendment) Regulations Order of Council 1993 (S.I. 1993/610)
- Education (Welsh Agricultural College Higher Education Corporation) (Designated Staff) Order 1993 (S.I. 1993/611)
- Education (Further Education Corporations) (Designated Staff) (Wales) Order 1993 (S.I. 1993/612)
- Local Government Finance (Payments) (Welsh Authorities) Regulations 1993 (S.I. 1993/613)
- National Board for Nursing, Midwifery and Health Visiting for Wales (Constitution and Administration) Order 1993 (S.I. 1993/614)
- Valuation and Community Charge Tribunals (Amendment) (No. 2) Regulations 1993 (S.I. 1993/615)
- Local Government Finance (Repeals, Savings and Consequential Amendments) Order 1993 (S.I. 1993/616)
- Magistrates' Courts (Reciprocal Enforcement of Maintenance Orders) (Miscellaneous Amendments) Rules 1993 (S.I. 1993/617)
- Maintenance Orders (Reciprocal Enforcement) Act 1992 (Commencement) Order 1993 (S.I. 1993/618)
- Public Trustee (Fees) (Amendment) Order 1993 (S.I. 1993/619)
- Child Maintenance (Written Agreements) Order 1993 (S.I. 1993/620)
- Children (Admissibility of Hearsay Evidence) Order 1993 (S.I. 1993/621)
- High Court (Distribution of Business) Order 1993 (S.I. 1993/622)
- Maintenance Orders (Backdating) Order 1993 (S.I. 1993/623)
- Children (Allocation of Proceedings) (Amendment) Order 1993 (S.I. 1993/624)
- Education (Listed Bodies) Order 1993 (S.I. 1993/625)
- Education (Recognised Bodies) Order 1993 (S.I. 1993/626)
- Family Proceedings Courts (Child Support Act 1991) Rules 1993 (S.I. 1993/627)
- Education (Queen Elizabeth Atherstone Further Education Corporation) (Dissolution) Order 1993 (S.I. 1993/628)
- National Board for Nursing, Midwifery and Health Visiting for England (Constitution and Administration) Order 1993 (S.I. 1993/629)
- Motor Vehicles (Type Approval and Approval Marks) (Fees) Regulations 1993 (S.I. 1993/630)
- A65 Trunk Road (Hellifield and Long Preston Bypass and Slip Roads) Order 1993 (S.I. 1993/631)
- A65 Trunk Road (Bigholmes Lane to Switchers) (Detrunking) Order 1993 (S.I. 1993/632)
- National Board for Nursing, Midwifery and Health Visiting for Scotland Order 1993 (S.I. 1993/637)
- Lothian and Central Regions and West Lothian and Falkirk Districts (Mannerston/Cauldcoats Holdings and M9 Motorway) Boundaries Amendment Order 1993 (S.I. 1993/638)
- Dunfermline and Kirkcaldy Districts (Mossmorran) Boundaries Amendment Order 1993 (S.I. 1993/639)
- Dumfries and Galloway and Strathclyde Regions and Cumnock and Doon Valley and Stewartry Districts (Loch Doon) Boundaries Amendment Order 1993 (S.I. 1993/640)
- Law Reform (Miscellaneous Provisions) (Scotland) Act 1990 (Commencement No. 11) Order 1993 (S.I. 1993/641)
- National Health Service (Travelling Expenses and Remission of Charges) (Scotland) Amendment Regulations 1993 (S.I. 1993/642)
- Glasgow Polytechnic and The Queen's College, Glasgow (Closure) (Scotland) Order 1993 (S.I. 1993/643)
- Local Authorities Etc. (Allowances) (Scotland) Amendment Regulations 1993 (S.I. 1993/644)
- Assured Tenancies (Rent Information) (Scotland) Amendment Order 1993 (S.I. 1993/645)
- Rent Officers (Additional Functions) (Scotland) Amendment Order 1993 (S.I. 1993/646)
- Rent Regulation (Forms and Information etc.) (Scotland) Amendment Regulations 1993 (S.I. 1993/647)
- Assured Tenancies (Forms) (Scotland) Amendment Regulations 1993 (S.I. 1993/648)
- Assured Tenancies (Rent Book) (Scotland) Amendment Regulations 1993 (S.I. 1993/649)
- Social Security (Payments on account, Overpayments and Recovery) Amendment Regulations 1993 (S.I. 1993/650)
- Local Government Finance (Housing) (Consequential Amendments) Order 1993 (S.I. 1993/651)
- Rent Officers (Additional Functions) (Amendment) Order 1993 (S.I. 1993/652)
- Rent Assessment Committees (England and Wales) (Amendment) Regulations 1993 (S.I. 1993/653)
- Assured Tenancies and Agricultural Occupancies (Forms) (Amendment) Regulations 1993 (S.I. 1993/654)
- Rent Act 1977 (Forms etc.) (Amendment) Regulations 1993 (S.I. 1993/655)
- Rent Book (Forms of Notice) (Amendment) Regulations 1993 (S.I. 1993/656)
- Assured Tenancies and Agricultural Occupancies (Rent Information) (Amendment) Order 1993 (S.I. 1993/657)
- Local Government Finance (Housing) (Consequential Amendments) (Scotland) Order 1993 (S.I. 1993/658)
- Rent Assessment Committees (Scotland) (Consequential Amendments) Regulations 1993 (S.I. 1993/659)
- Child Support (Amendments to Primary Legislation) (Scotland) Order 1993 (S.I. 1993/660)
- A66 Trunk Road (Stainmore-Banks Gate De-Trunking) Order 1993 (S.I. 1993/661)
- A66 Trunk Road (Stainmore-Banks Gate Improvement) Order 1993 (S.I. 1993/662)
- County of Wiltshire (Electoral Arrangements) Order 1993 (S.I. 1993/679)
- M621 To M1 Link Roads (and Connecting Roads) Scheme 1993 (S.I. 1993/681)
- Nuclear Installations (Application of Security Provisions) Order 1993 (S.I. 1993/687)
- Council Tax Benefit (General) Amendment Regulations 1993 (S.I. 1993/688)
- Council Tax Benefit (Permitted Total) Order 1993 (S.I. 1993/689)
- Adoption (Designation of Overseas Adoptions) (Variation) Order 1993 (S.I. 1993/690)
- Cheshire, Lancashire and Merseyside (County and Metropolitan Borough Boundaries) Order 1993 (S.I. 1993/691)
- War Pensions (Miscellaneous Amendments) Order 1993 (S.I. 1993/692)
- Guy's and St Thomas' National Health Service Trust (Establishment) Order 1993 (S.I. 1993/693)
- Lewisham Hospital National Health Service Trust (Establishment) Order 1993 (S.I. 1993/694)
- St Thomas' Hospital National Health Service Trust Dissolution Order 1993 (S.I. 1993/695)
- Guy's and Lewisham National Health Service Trust Dissolution Order 1993 (S.I. 1993/696)
- Barts National Health Service Trust Dissolution Order 1993 (S.I. 1993/697)
- King's Healthcare National Health Service Trust (Establishment) Amendment Order 1993 (S.I. 1993/698)

==== 700–799 ====
- Register of County Court Judgments (Amendment) Regulations 1993 (S.I. 1993/710)
- County Court (Amendment) Rules 1993 (S.I. 1993/711)
- County Court (Forms)(Amendment) Rules 1993 (S.I. 1993/712)
- North Staffordshire Hospital Centre National Health Service Trust (Change of Name) Order 1993 (S.I. 1993/713)
- Housing Renovation etc. Grants (Prescribed Forms and Particulars) (Welsh Forms and Particulars) (Amendment) Regulations 1993 (S.I. 1993/715)
- Combined Probation Areas (Amendment) (No. 2) Order 1993 (S.I. 1993/716)
- A4 and A46 Trunk Roads (Batheaston/Swainswick Bypass and Slip Roads) Order 1993 (S.I. 1993/717)
- A4 and A46 Trunk Roads (Batheaston/Swainswick Bypass and Slip Roads) (Detrunking) Order 1993 (S.I. 1993/718)
- Export of Goods (Control) (Bosnia-Herzegovina) (ECSC) Order 1993 (S.I. 1993/719)
- Police (Common Police Services) (Scotland) Order 1993 (S.I. 1993/720)
- Grant for Bail Services (Scotland) Order 1993 (S.I. 1993/721)
- Social Security (Industrial Injuries) (Dependency) (Permitted Earnings Limits) Order 1993 (S.I. 1993/722)
- Social Security Benefits Up-rating Regulations 1993 (S.I. 1993/723)
- Income Tax (Sub-contractors in the Construction Industry) (Amendment) Regulations 1993 (S.I. 1993/724)
- Income Tax (Employments) (No. 24) Regulations 1993 (S.I. 1993/725)
- Income Tax (Employments) (No. 25) Regulations 1993 (S.I. 1993/726)
- Income Tax (Employments) (No. 26) Regulations 1993 (S.I. 1993/727)
- Rules of the Air (Second Amendment) Regulations 1993 (S.I. 1993/728)
- Derbyshire, Nottinghamshire and South Yorkshire (County and District Boundaries) Order 1993 (S.I. 1993/729)
- Income Tax (Sub-contractors in the Construction Industry) Regulations 1993 (S.I. 1993/743)
- Income Tax (Employments) Regulations 1993 (S.I. 1993/744)
- Health and Safety (Miscellaneous Modifications) Regulations 1993 (S.I. 1993/745)
- Access to Health Records (Control of Access) Regulations 1993 (S.I. 1993/746)
- Prevention of Terrorism (Temporary Provisions) Act 1989 (Continuance) Order 1993 (S.I. 1993/747)
- Combined Probation Areas (Northumbria) Order 1993 (S.I. 1993/748)
- Combined Probation Areas (Staffordshire) Order 1993 (S.I. 1993/749)
- Combined Probation Areas (Surrey) Order 1993 (S.I. 1993/750)
- Medicines Control Agency Trading Fund Order 1993 (S.I. 1993/751)
- Bingo Duty (Exemptions) Order 1993 (S.I. 1993/752)
- Finance Act 1989, section 158(1) and (2), (Appointed Days) Order 1993 (S.I. 1993/753)
- Finance Act 1989, section 178(1), (Appointed Day) Order 1993 (S.I. 1993/754)
- Income Tax (Indexation) Order 1993 (S.I. 1993/755)
- Personal Equity Plan (Amendment) Regulations 1993 (S.I. 1993/756)
- Retirement Benefits Schemes (Indexation of Earnings Cap) Order 1993 (S.I. 1993/757)
- Taxes (Interest Rate) (Amendment No. 2) Regulations 1993 (S.I. 1993/758)
- Inheritance Tax (Indexation) Order 1993 (S.I. 1993/759)
- Capital Gains Tax (Annual Exempt Amount) Order 1993 (S.I. 1993/760)
- Value Added Tax (Accounting and Records) (Amendment) Regulations 1993 (S.I. 1993/761)
- Value Added Tax (Cash Accounting) (Amendment) Regulations 1993 (S.I. 1993/762)
- Value Added Tax (Education) Order 1993 (S.I. 1993/763)
- Value Added Tax (General) (Amendment) (No. 2) Regulations 1993 (S.I. 1993/764)
- Value Added Tax (Increase of Consideration for Fuel) Order 1993 (S.I. 1993/765)
- Value Added Tax (Increase of Registration Limits) Order 1993 (S.I. 1993/766)
- Value Added Tax (Protective Boots and Helmets) Order 1993 (S.I. 1993/767)
- Registered Establishments (Fees) (Scotland) Order 1993 (S.I. 1993/768)
- Act of Sederunt (Interest in Sheriff Court Decrees and Extracts) 1993 (S.I. 1993/769)
- Act of Sederunt (Rules of the Court of Session Amendment) (Interest in Decrees and Extracts) 1993 (S.I. 1993/770)
- Water Undertakers (Rateable Values) (Amendment) Order 1993 (S.I. 1993/772)
- Council Tax (Administration and Enforcement) (Amendment) (No. 2) Regulations 1993 (S.I. 1993/773)
- Non-Domestic Rating (Collection and Enforcement) (Amendment and Miscellaneous Provision) Regulations 1993 (S.I. 1993/774)
- Community Charges (Administration and Enforcement) (Amendment) Regulations 1993 (S.I. 1993/775)
- Pensions Increase (Review) Order 1993 (S.I. 1993/779)
- British Railways (Penalty Fares) Act 1989 (Activating No. 9) Order 1993 (S.I. 1993/780)
- British Railways (Penalty Fares) Act 1989 (Activating No. 10) Order 1993 (S.I. 1993/781)
- Premium Savings Bonds (Amendment) Regulations 1993 (S.I. 1993/782)
- National Savings Stock Register (Amendment) Regulations 1993 (S.I. 1993/783)
- Redundancy Payments (Local Government) (Modification) (Amendment) Order 1993 (S.I. 1993/784)
- Child Support Act 1991 (Consequential Amendments) Order 1993 (S.I. 1993/785)
- Chester Port Health Authority (Revocation)Order 1993 (S.I. 1993/786)
- Civil Legal Aid (Assessment of Resources) (Amendment) Regulations 1993 (S.I. 1993/788)
- Legal Aid in Criminal and Care Proceedings (General) (Amendment) Regulations 1993 (S.I. 1993/789)
- Legal Advice and Assistance (Amendment) Regulations 1993 (S.I. 1993/790)
- Measuring Instruments (EEC Requirements) (Fees) Regulations 1993 (S.I. 1993/798)
- Public Lending Right (Increase of Limit) Order 1993 (S.I. 1993/799)

==== 800–899 ====
- South Eastern Combined Fire Area Administration (Amendment) (No. 2) Scheme Order 1993 (S.I. 1993/800)
- Greater London and Kent (County Boundaries) (Variation) Order 1993 (S.I. 1993/805)
- Pensions Increase (Civil Service Early Retirement Pension Scheme 1992) Regulations 1993 (S.I. 1993/806)
- Injuries in War (Shore Employments) Compensation (Amendment) Scheme 1992 S.I. 1993/807)
- Devon Ambulance Service National Health Service Trust Dissolution Order 1993 (S.I. 1993/809)
- Cornwall Community Healthcare National Health Service Trust Dissolution Order 1993 (S.I. 1993/810)
- Walsgrave Hospitals National Health Service Trust (Establishment) Order 1993 (S.I. 1993/811)
- Walsgrave Hospital National Health Service Trust Dissolution Order 1993 (S.I. 1993/812)
- Cornwall Healthcare National Health Service Trust (Establishment) Order 1993 (S.I. 1993/813)
- Westcountry Ambulance Services National Health Service Trust (Establishment) Order 1993 (S.I. 1993/814)
- Reconstitution of the Romney Marsh Levels Internal Drainage Board Order 1993 (S.I. 1993/815)
- Reconstitution of the Finningley Internal Drainage Board Order 1993 (S.I. 1993/816)
- Reconstitution of the River Stour (Kent) Internal Drainage Board S.I. 1993/817)
- Civil Legal Aid (Scotland) Amendment (No.2) Regulations 1993 (S.I. 1993/818)
- Advice and Assistance (Scotland) Amendment (No.2) Regulations 1993 (S.I. 1993/819)
- Harefield Hospital National Health Service Trust (Transfer of Trust Property) Order 1993 (S.I. 1993/820)
- Social Security (Contributions) Amendment (No. 5) Regulations 1993 (S.I. 1993/821)
- Hinchingbrooke Health Care National Health Service Trust Dissolution Order 1993 (S.I. 1993/822)
- Hinchingbrooke Health Care National Health Service Trust (Establishment) Order 1993 (S.I. 1993/823)
- Reconstitution of the Upper Medway Internal Drainage Board Order 1993 (S.I. 1993/824)
- Reconstitution of the Lower Medway Internal Drainage Board Order 1993 (S.I. 1993/825)
- National Rivers Authority (Severn-Trent Region) (Reconstitution of the Newark Area Internal Drainage Board) Order 1993 (S.I. 1993/829)
- Non-Domestic Rates (No.2) (Scotland) Order 1993 (S.I. 1993/830)
- Medicines (Applications for Manufacturer's and Wholesale Dealer's Licences) Amendment Regulations 1993 (S.I. 1993/832)
- Medicines (Standard Provisions for Licences and Certificates) Amendment Regulations 1993 (S.I. 1993/833)
- Medicines Act 1968 (Amendment) Regulations 1993 (S.I. 1993/834)
- Education (Individual Pupils' Achievements) (Information) (Wales) Regulations 1993 (S.I. 1993/835)
- Banking Act 1987 (Disclosure of Information) (Specified Persons) (Revocation) Order 1993 (S.I. 1993/836)
- Education (Grant-maintained Schools) (Finance) (Amendment) Regulations 1993 (S.I. 1993/843)
- Social Security (Miscellaneous Provisions) Amendment Regulations 1993 (S.I. 1993/846)
- The Official Secrets Act 1989 (Prescription) (Amendment) Order 1993 (S.I. 1993/847)
- Local Government (Direct Service Organisations) (Competition) Regulations 1993 (S.I. 1993/848)
- Calderdale and Kirklees (Metropolitan Borough Boundaries) Order 1993 (S.I. 1993/850)
- Bolton and Salford (City and Metropolitan Borough Boundaries) Order 1993 (S.I. 1993/851)
- Value Added Tax (General) (Amendment) (No.3) Regulations 1993 (S.I. 1993/856)
- Social Security (Industrial Injuries and Adjudication) Regulations 1993 (S.I. 1993/861)
- Social Security (Industrial Injuries) (Prescribed Diseases) Amendment Regulations 1993 (S.I. 1993/862)
- Official Secrets (Prohibited Places) (Amendment) Order 1993 S.I. 1993/863)
- Devon and Cornwall Police (Amalgamation) (Amendment) Order 1993 (S.I. 1993/864)
- West Mercia Police (Amalgamation) (Amendment) Order 1993 (S.I. 1993/865)
- Sussex Police (Amalgamation) (Amendment) Order 1993 (S.I. 1993/866)
- Avon and Somerset Police (Amalgamation) (Amendment) Order 1993 (S.I. 1993/867)
- Thames Valley Police (Amalgamation) (Amendment) Order 1993 (S.I. 1993/868)
- South Wales Police (Amalgamation) (Amendment) Order 1993 (S.I. 1993/869)
- Education (Designated Institutions in Further and Higher Education) (Interpretation) (Amendment) Order 1993 (S.I. 1993/870)
- A13 Trunk Road (Newham, Barking and Dagenham, and Havering) (Speed Limits) Order 1988 (Variation) Order 1993 (S.I. 1993/871)
- Western Isles Islands Council (Lochmaddy) Water Order 1993 (S.I. 1993/872)
- Oil Related and Petrochemical Plants (Rateable Values) (Scotland) Order 1993 (S.I. 1993/873)
- Electricity Generators (Rateable Values) (Scotland) Order 1993 (S.I. 1993/874)
- Scottish Hydro-Electric plc. (Rateable Values) (Scotland) Order 1993 (S.I. 1993/875)
- Industrial and Freight Transport (Rateable Values) (Scotland) Order 1993 (S.I. 1993/876)
- Scottish Nuclear Limited (Rateable Values) (Scotland) Order 1993 (S.I. 1993/877)
- Scottish Power plc. (Rateable Values) (Scotland) Order 1993 (S.I. 1993/878)
- British Gas plc. (Rateable Values) (Scotland) Order 1993 (S.I. 1993/879)
- British Railways Board (Rateable Values) (Scotland) Order 1993 (S.I. 1993/880)
- British Telecommunications plc. (Rateable Values) (Scotland) Order 1993 (S.I. 1993/881)
- Glasgow Underground (Rateable Values) (Scotland) Order 1993 (S.I. 1993/882)
- Lochaber Power Company (Rateable Values) (Scotland) Order 1993 (S.I. 1993/883)
- Mercury Communications Ltd. (Rateable Values) (Scotland) Order 1993 (S.I. 1993/884)
- Mines and Quarries (Rateable Values) (Scotland) Order 1993 (S.I. 1993/885)
- Water Undertakings (Rateable Values) (Scotland) Order 1993 (S.I. 1993/886)
- National Health Service Act 1977 (Composition of Medical Practices Committee) Modification Order 1993 (S.I. 1993/887)
- A1 Trunk Road (Islington) Red Route Traffic Order 1993 (S.I. 1993/891)
- United Kingdom Central Council for Nursing, Midwifery and Health Visiting (Legal Assessors) (Amendment) Order 1993 (S.I. 1993/892)
- Nurses, Midwives and Health Visitors (Professional Conduct) Rules 1993 Approval Order 1993 (S.I. 1993/893)
- Non-Domestic Rating (Collection and Enforcement) (Amendment and Miscellaneous Provision) (No. 2) Regulations 1993 (S.I. 1993/894)
- A1 Trunk Road (Islington) (Bus Lanes) Red Route Traffic Order 1993 (S.I. 1993/895)
- A1 Trunk Road (Haringey) Red Route Traffic Order 1993 (S.I. 1993/896)
- A1 Trunk Road (Haringey) (Bus Lanes) Red Route Traffic Order 1993 (S.I. 1993/897)
- Act of Sederunt (Fees of Solicitors in the Sheriff Court) (Amendment) 1993 (S.I. 1993/898)
- Act of Sederunt (Rules of the Court of Session Amendment) (Register of Insolvencies) 1993 (S.I. 1993/899)

==== 900–999 ====
- Act of Sederunt (Rules of the Court of Session Amendment No. 2) (Fees of Solicitors) 1993 (S.I. 1993/900)
- Further Education (Exclusion of Land from Transfer) Order 1993 (S.I. 1993/901)
- Greater Manchester and Lancashire (County and Metropolitan Borough Boundaries) Order 1993 (S.I. 1993/902)
- Dyfed-Powys Police (Amalgamation) (Amendment) Order 1993 (S.I. 1993/909)
- National Rivers Authority (Anglian Region) (Reconstitution of the Witham Third District Internal Drainage Board) Order 1993 (S.I. 1993/910)
- Plymouth Development Corporation (Area and Constitution) Order 1993 (S.I. 1993/911)
- Electricity (Restrictive Trade Practices Act 1976) (Exemption) Order 1993 (S.I. 1993/912)
- Child Support (Miscellaneous Amendments) Regulations 1993 (S.I. 1993/913)
- Act of Sederunt (Child Support Act 1991) (Amendment of Ordinary Cause and Summary Cause Rules) 1993 (S.I. 1993/919)
- Act of Sederunt (Child Support Rules) 1993 (S.I. 1993/920)
- Act of Sederunt (Bankruptcy Rules) 1993 (S.I. 1993/921)
- Land Registration (Scotland) Act 1979 (Commencement No. 7) Order 1993 (S.I. 1993/922)
- Dairy Produce Quotas Regulations 1993 (S.I. 1993/923)
- Education (Dissolution of the Council for National Academic Awards) Order 1993 (S.I. 1993/924)
- Child Support (Maintenance Assessments and Special Cases) Amendment Regulations 1993 (S.I. 1993/925)
- Greater Manchester and Lancashire (County and District Boundaries) Order 1993 (S.I. 1993/926)
- Secure Tenancies (Designated Courses) (Amendment) Regulations 1993 (S.I. 1993/931)
- Friendly Societies Act 1992 (Transitional and Consequential Provisions and Savings) Regulations 1993 (S.I. 1993/932)
- Finance Act 1991, section 58, (Commencement No. 3) Regulations 1993 (S.I. 1993/933)
- Legal Aid in Criminal and Care Proceedings (Costs) (Amendment) Regulations 1993 (S.I. 1993/934)
- Housing Benefit and Community Charge Benefit (Subsidy) (No. 2) Order 1993 (S.I. 1993/935)
- Certification Officer (Amendment of Fees) Regulations 1993 (S.I. 1993/936)
- Further Education (Exclusion of Land from Transfer) (No. 2) Order 1993 (S.I. 1993/937)
- Land Registry Trading Fund Order 1993 (S.I. 1993/938)
- Land Registration (Determination of Costs) Order 1993 (S.I. 1993/939)
- Local Government Administration (Matters Subject to Investigation) Order 1993 (S.I. 1993/940)
- Local Elections (Variation of Limits of Candidates' Election Expenses) (Northern Ireland) Order 1993 (S.I. 1993/941)
- Copyright (Application to Other Countries) Order 1993 (S.I. 1993/942)
- Performances (Reciprocal Protection) (Convention Countries) Order 1993 (S.I. 1993/943)
- European Communities (Definition of Treaties) (International Railway Tariffs Agreements) Order 1993 (S.I. 1993/944)
- Insurance Companies (Accounts and Statements) (Amendment) Regulations 1993 (S.I. 1993/946)
- Patents (Supplementary Protection Certificate for Medicinal Products) (Amendment) Rules 1993 (S.I. 1993/947)
- Chessington Computer Centre Trading Fund Order 1993 (S.I. 1993/948)
- Income Tax (Interest Relief) (Qualifying Lenders) Order 1993 (S.I. 1993/949)
- Capital Gains Tax (Gilt-edged Securities) Order 1993 (S.I. 1993/950)
- Banking Act 1987 (Exempt Persons) Order 1993 (S.I. 1993/953)
- Financial Services Act 1986 (Overseas Investment Exchanges and Overseas Clearing Houses) (Periodical Fees) Regulations 1993 (S.I. 1993/954)
- City of Glasgow and Monklands Districts (Bargeddie) Boundaries Amendment (No. 2) Order 1993 (S.I. 1993/960)
- Child Support Appeals (Jurisdiction of Courts) Order 1993 (S.I. 1993/961)
- Education (School Teachers' Pay and Conditions) Order 1993 (S.I. 1993/962)
- Social Security Benefits (Miscellaneous Amendments) (No. 2) Regulations 1993 (S.I. 1993/963)
- National Assistance (Assessment of Resources) (Amendment) Regulations 1993 (S.I. 1993/964)
- Child Benefit and Social Security (Miscellaneous Amendments) Regulations 1993 (S.I. 1993/965)
- Child Support Act 1991 (Commencement No. 3 and Transitional Provisions) Amendment Order 1993 (S.I. 1993/966)
- Gaming Act (Variation of Monetary Limits) Order 1993 (S.I. 1993/967)
- Gaming Clubs (Hours and Charges) (Amendment) Regulations 1993 (S.I. 1993/968)
- Legal Aid (Scotland) Act 1986 Amendment Regulations 1993 (S.I. 1993/969)
- Civil Legal Aid (Financial Conditions and Contributions) (Scotland) Regulations 1993 (S.I. 1993/970)
- Advice and Assistance (Financial Conditions) (Scotland) Regulations 1993 (S.I. 1993/971)
- Advice and Assistance (Assistance by Way of Representation) (Scotland) Amendment Regulations 1993 (S.I. 1993/972)
- Advice and Assistance (Scotland) (Prospective Cost) Amendment Regulations 1993 (S.I. 1993/973)
- Education (Grants for Further Training of Teachers and Educational Psychologists Etc.) (Scotland) Regulations 1993 (S.I. 1993/974)
- Road Traffic Act 1991 (Commencement No. 6) Order 1993 (S.I. 1993/975)
- Protection of Wrecks (Designation No. 1) Order 1993 (S.I. 1993/976)
- Banking Appeal Tribunal (Amendment) Regulations 1993 (S.I. 1993/982)
- Building Societies Appeal Tribunal (Amendment) Regulations 1993 (S.I. 1993/983)
- Building Societies (Prescribed Contracts) Order 1993 (S.I. 1993/984)
- Building Societies (Designation of Qualifying Bodies) Order 1993 (S.I. 1993/985)
- Sale of Registration Marks (Amendment) Regulations 1993 (S.I. 1993/986)
- Retention of Registration Marks Regulations 1993 (S.I. 1993/987)
- Retention of Registration Marks Regulations 1992 (Amendment) Regulations 1993 (S.I. 1993/988)
- Building Societies (Designation of Qualifying Bodies) (No. 2) Order 1993 (S.I. 1993/989)
- Animals, Meat and Meat Products (Examination for Residues and Maximum Residue Limits) (Amendment) Regulations 1993 (S.I. 1993/990)
- Tayside Region (Electoral Arrangements) Order 1993 (S.I. 1993/991)
- Dumfries and Galloway Region (Electoral Arrangements) Order 1993 (S.I. 1993/992)
- National Health Service (Appointment of Consultants) (Scotland) Regulations 1993 (S.I. 1993/994)
- Assured Tenancies (Exceptions) (Scotland) Amendment Regulations 1993 (S.I. 1993/995)
- Environmentally Sensitive Areas (Central Southern Uplands) Designation Order 1993 (S.I. 1993/996)
- Environmentally Sensitive Areas (Western Southern Uplands) Designation Order 1993 (S.I. 1993/997)
- Education (School Curriculum and Related Information) (Amendment) (Wales) Regulations 1993 (S.I. 1993/998)

=== 1000-1499 ===
==== 1000–1099 ====
- Export of Goods (Control) (Amendment) Order 1993 (S.I. 1993/1020)
- Foreign Satellite Service Proscription Order 1993 (S.I. 1993/1024)
- Social Security (Consequential Provisions) Act 1992 Appointed Day Order 1993 (S.I. 1993/1025)
- Cranfield Airport (Designation) (Detention and Sale of Aircraft) Order 1993 (S.I. 1993/1026)
- Weymouth and Portland Harbour Revision Order 1993 (S.I. 1993/1027)
- Town and Country Planning (General Permitted Development) (Scotland) Amendment Order 1993 (S.I. 1993/1036)
- Gaming Act (Variation of Monetary Limits) (Scotland) Order 1993 (S.I. 1993/1037)
- Town and Country Planning (Use Classes) (Scotland) Amendment Order 1993 (S.I. 1993/1038)
- Town and Country Planning (General S.I. 1993/1039)
- Gaming Clubs (Hours and Charges) (Scotland) Amendment Regulations 1993 (S.I. 1993/1040)
- Reconstitution of the Bedfordshire and River Ivel Internal Drainage Board Order 1993 (S.I. 1993/1041)
- Glan Conwy-Conwy Morfa Trunk Road (A547) (Previously known as and forming part of The Chester—Bangor Trunk Road (A55)) Detrunking Order 1993 (S.I. 1993/1057)
- International Finance Corporation (1991 General Capital Increase) Order 1993 (S.I. 1993/1059)
- Asian Development Bank (Fifth Replenishment of the Asian Development Fund and Second Regularized Replenishment of the Technical Assistance Special Fund) Order 1993 (S.I. 1993/1060)
- Banking Appeal Tribunal (Scottish Appeals) Amendment Regulations 1993 (S.I. 1993/1061)
- Financial Assistance for Environmental Purposes Order 1993 (S.I. 1993/1062)
- A43 Trunk Road (Silverstone Bypass and Slip Roads) Order 1993 (S.I. 1993/1063)
- A43 Trunk Road (Silverstone Bypass) (Detrunking) Order 1993 (S.I. 1993/1064)
- North Norfolk Action (Miscellaneous Provisions) Order 1993 (S.I. 1993/1065)
- Gipsy Encampments (Metropolitan District of Sefton) Order 1993 (S.I. 1993/1066)
- Airports Slot Allocation Regulations 1993 (S.I. 1993/1067)
- Oldham National Health Service Trust (Transfer of Trust Property) Order 1993 (S.I. 1993/1068)
- Cornwall and Isles of Scilly Mental Handicap National Health Service Trust (Change of Name) Order 1993 (S.I. 1993/1069)
- Merchant Shipping (Vessels in Commercial Use for Sport or Pleasure) Regulations 1993 (S.I. 1993/1072)
- Aviation Security (Air Cargo Agents) Regulations 1993 (S.I. 1993/1073)
- Vocational Training (Public Financial Assistance and Disentitlement to Tax Relief) (Amendment) Regulations 1993 (S.I. 1993/1074)
- Plymouth Development Corporation (Planning Functions) Order 1993 (S.I. 1993/1075)
- Social Security (Consequential Provisions) (Northern Ireland) Act 1992 Appointed Day Order 1993 (S.I. 1993/1079)
- Vocational Training (Tax Relief) (Amendment) Regulations 1993 (S.I. 1993/1082)
- Peak Rail Light Railway Order 1993 (S.I. 1993/1083)
- Dacorum and St Albans Community National Health Service Trust (Transfer of Trust Property) Order 1993 (S.I. 1993/1084)
- Rochdale Healthcare National Health Service Trust (Transfer of Trust Property) Order 1993 (S.I. 1993/1085)
- Horizon National Health Service Trust (Transfer of Trust Property) Order 1993 (S.I. 1993/1086)
- Bexley and Greenwich (London Borough Boundaries) Order 1993 (S.I. 1993/1091)
- Insurance Companies (Cancellation No. 2) Regulations 1993 (S.I. 1993/1092)
- London Cab Order 1993 (S.I. 1993/1093)
- Highland Region (Electoral Arrangements) Order 1993 (S.I. 1993/1094)
- Fife Region (Electoral Arrangements) Order 1993 (S.I. 1993/1095)
- Local Government Staff Commission (England) Order 1993 (S.I. 1993/1098)

==== 1100–1199 ====
- Welfare Food Amendment Regulations 1993 (S.I. 1993/1105)
- A630 Trunk Road (Rotherham) (Detrunking) Order 1993 (S.I. 1993/1107)
- Social Security (Claims and Payments) Amendment (No. 2) Regulations 1993 (S.I. 1993/1113)
- Local Fisheries Committees (Fees for Copy Byelaws) Order 1993 (S.I. 1993/1116)
- Legal Aid in Family Proceedings (Remuneration) (Amendment) Regulations 1993 (S.I. 1993/1117)
- Central and Fife Regions and Clackmannan and Dunfermline Districts (River Forth, Kilbagie Mill, Slack Cottage and River Black Devon) Boundaries Amendment Order 1993 (S.I. 1993/1118)
- Transport and Works Applications (Inland Waterways Procedure) Regulations 1993 (S.I. 1993/1119)
- Local Government Finance (Housing) (Consequential Amendments) (Amendment) Order 1993 (S.I. 1993/1120)
- Road Traffic (Training of Drivers of Vehicles Carrying Dangerous Goods) (Amendment) Regulations 1993 (S.I. 1993/1122)
- Value Added Tax (Education) (No. 2) Order 1993 (S.I. 1993/1124)
- Grampian Region (Electoral Arrangements) Order 1993 (S.I. 1993/1125)
- Moray Health Services National Health Service Trust (Appointment of Trustees) Order 1993 (S.I. 1993/1126)
- Royal Scottish National Hospital and Community National Health Service Trust (Appointment of Trustees) Order 1993 (S.I. 1993/1127)
- Royal Alexandra Hospital National Health Service Trust (Appointment of Trustees) Order 1993 (S.I. 1993/1128)
- Raigmore Hospital National Health Service Trust (Appointment of Trustees) Order 1993 (S.I. 1993/1129)
- Grampian Healthcare National Health Service Trust (Appointment of Trustees) Order 1993 (S.I. 1993/1130)
- Dundee Teaching Hospitals National Health Service Trust (Appointment of Trustees) Order 1993 (S.I. 1993/1131)
- Caithness and Sutherland National Health Service Trust (Appointment of Trustees) Order 1993 (S.I. 1993/1132)
- Southern General Hospital National Health Service Trust (Appointment of Trustees) Order 1993 (S.I. 1993/1133)
- Stirling Royal Infirmary National Health Service Trust (Appointment of Trustees) Order 1993 (S.I. 1993/1134)
- Victoria Infirmary National Health Service Trust (Appointment of Trustees) Order 1993 (S.I. 1993/1135)
- West Lothian National Health Service Trust (Appointment of Trustees) Order 1993 (S.I. 1993/1136)
- Yorkhill National Health Service Trust (Appointment of Trustees) Order 1993 (S.I. 1993/1137)
- North Ayrshire and Arran National Health Service Trust (Appointment of Trustees) Order 1993 (S.I. 1993/1138)
- Monklands and Bellshill Hospitals National Health Service Trust (Appointment of Trustees) Order 1993 (S.I. 1993/1139)
- Ayrshire and Arran Community Health Care National Health Service Trust (Appointment of Trustees) Order 1993 (S.I. 1993/1140)
- Essex and Greater London (County and London Borough Boundaries) Order 1993 (S.I. 1993/1141)
- Croydon, Lambeth and Southwark (London Borough Boundaries) Order 1993 (S.I. 1993/1147)
- Greater London and Surrey (County and London Borough Boundaries) Order 1993 (S.I. 1993/1148)
- Coast Protection (Variation of Excluded Waters) Regulations 1993 (S.I. 1993/1149)
- Income-related Benefits Schemes (Miscellaneous Amendments) (No. 2) Regulations 1993 (S.I. 1993/1150)
- Food Protection (Emergency Prohibitions) (Oil and Chemical Pollution of Fish) (No.2) (Partial Revocation) Order 1993 (S.I. 1993/1151)
- Finance Act 1991 (Commencement and Transitional Provisions) Order 1993 (S.I. 1993/1152)
- Water Byelaws (Milngavie Waterworks, Loch Katrine, Loch Arklet, Glen Finglas) Extension Order 1993 (S.I. 1993/1153)
- Control of Pollution (Exemption of Certain Discharges from Control) (Scotland) Variation Order 1993 (S.I. 1993/1154)
- Control of Pollution (Registers) (Scotland) Regulations 1993 (S.I. 1993/1155)
- Control of Pollution (Discharges by Islands Councils) (Scotland) Regulations 1993 (S.I. 1993/1156)
- Robert Gordon University (Scotland) Order of Council 1993 (S.I. 1993/1157)
- Pneumoconiosis etc. (Workers' Compensation) (Payment of Claims) (Amendment) Regulations 1993 (S.I. 1993/1158)
- Social Security Revaluation of Earnings Factors Order 1993 (S.I. 1993/1159)
- Emulsifiers and Stabilisers in Food (Amendment) Regulations 1993 (S.I. 1993/1161)
- National Rivers Authority (Anglian Region) (Reconstitution of the Skegness District Internal Drainage Board) Order 1993 (S.I. 1993/1174)
- Reconstitution of the Denge and Southbrooks Internal Drainage Board Order 1993 (S.I. 1993/1175)
- Civil Aviation (Navigation Services Charges) (Third Amendment) Regulations 1993 (S.I. 1993/1176)
- Undersized Lobsters Order 1993 (S.I. 1993/1178)
- PARLIAMENT S.I. 1993/1181)
- Magistrates' Courts (Miscellaneous Amendments) Rules 1993 (S.I. 1993/1183)
- British Wool (Guaranteed Prices) (Revocation) Order 1993 (S.I. 1993/1184)
- Friendly Societies Act 1992 (Commencement No. 5 and Savings) Order 1993 (S.I. 1993/1186)
- Friendly Societies Act 1992 (Consequential Provisions) (No. 2) Regulations 1993 (S.I. 1993/1187)
- Serbia and Montenegro (United Nations Sanctions) Order 1993 (S.I. 1993/1188)
- Export of Goods (Control) (Croatian and Bosnian Territories) Order 1993 (S.I. 1993/1189)
- Education (Schools) Act 1992 (Commencement No. 2 and Transitional Provision) Order 1993 (S.I. 1993/1190)
- Lothian Region (Electoral Arrangements) Order 1993 (S.I. 1993/1191)
- Injuries in War (Shore Employments) Compensation (Amendment) Scheme 1993 (S.I. 1993/1192)
- Electricity (Standards of Performance) Regulations 1993 (S.I. 1993/1193)
- Diseases of Animals (Approved Disinfectants) (Amendment) Order 1993 (S.I. 1993/1194)
- Serbia and Montenegro (United Nations Sanctions) (Dependent Territories) Order 1993 (S.I. 1993/1195)
- Sea Fish Licensing (Time at Sea) (Principles) Order 1993 (S.I. 1993/1196)
- Third Country Fishing (Enforcement) Order 1993 (S.I. 1993/1197)
- Police (Amendment) (No. 2) Regulations 1993 (S.I. 1993/1198)
- Lincolnshire County Council (Tattershall Bridge Reconstruction) Scheme 1991 Confirmation Instrument 1993 (S.I. 1993/1199)

==== 1200–1299 ====
- Export of Goods (Control) (Bosnia-Herzegovina) (ECSC) (Revocation) Order 1993 (S.I. 1993/1200)
- Scrabster Harbour Revision Order 1993 (S.I. 1993/1201)
- Road Traffic (Parking Adjudicators) (London) Regulations 1993 (S.I. 1993/1202)
- Lancashire and Merseyside (County Boundaries) Order 1993 (S.I. 1993/1206)
- Bromley, Croydon, Lambeth, Lewisham and Southwark (London Borough Boundaries) Order 1993 (S.I. 1993/1207)
- Greater London and Surrey (County and London Borough Boundaries) (No. 2) Order 1993 (S.I. 1993/1208)
- Medway Ports Authority (Dissolution) Order 1993 (S.I. 1993/1209)
- Environmentally Sensitive Areas (Ynys Môn) Designation Order 19930 S.I. 1993/1210)
- Environmentally Sensitive Areas (Radnor) Designation Order 1993 (S.I. 1993/1211)
- Cod (Irish Sea) (Prohibition of Fishing) Order 1993 (S.I. 1993/1212)
- Merchant Shipping (Local Passenger Vessels)(Masters' Licences and Hours, Manning and Training) Regulations 1993 (S.I. 1993/1213)
- Education (Student Loans) Regulations 1993 (S.I. 1993/1214)
- Act of Sederunt (Solicitor's Right of Audience) 1993 (S.I. 1993/1215)
- Essex and Greater London (County and London Borough Boundaries) (No.2) Order 1993 (S.I. 1993/1218)
- Income Support (General) Amendment (No. 2) Regulations 1993 (S.I. 1993/1219)
- A27 Trunk Road (Polegate Bypass) Order 1993 (S.I. 1993/1220)
- Motor Vehicles (EC Type Approval) (Amendment) Regulations 1993 (S.I. 1993/1221)
- Value Added Tax (Repayments to Third Country Traders) (Amendment) Regulations 1993 (S.I. 1993/1222)
- Value Added Tax (Repayment to Community Traders) (Amendment) Regulations 1993 (S.I. 1993/1223)
- Value Added Tax (General) (Amendment) (No. 4) Regulations 1993 (S.I. 1993/1224)
- Bromley and Greenwich (London Borough Boundaries) Order 1993 (S.I. 1993/1225)
- Medicines (Veterinary Drugs) (Renewal Applications for Licences and Animal Test Certificates) Regulations 1993 (S.I. 1993/1227)
- Beer Regulations 1993 (S.I. 1993/1228)
- Financial Services (Designated Countries and Territories) (Overseas Insurance Companies) Order 1993 (S.I. 1993/1237)
- Scottish Hospital Endowments Research Trust (Amendment) Regulations 1993 (S.I. 1993/1238)
- National Savings Bank (Investment Deposits) (Limits) (Amendment) Order 1993 (S.I. 1993/1239)
- Soft Drinks (Amendment) Regulations 1993 (S.I. 1993/1240)
- South West Regional Flood Defence Committee Order 1993 (S.I. 1993/1241)
- Social Security (Widow's Benefit and Retirement Pensions) Amendment Regulations 1993 (S.I. 1993/1242)
- Child Abduction and Custody (Parties to Conventions) (Amendment) Order 1993 (S.I. 1993/1243)
- Iraq (United Nations) (Sequestration of Assets) Order 1993 (S.I. 1993/1244)
- Iraq (United Nations) (Sequestration of Assets) (Dependent Territories) Order 1993 (S.I. 1993/1245)
- Treaty on Open Skies (Privileges and Immunities) Order 1993 (S.I. 1993/1246)
- Treaty on Open Skies (Privileges and Immunities) (Overseas Territories) Order 1993 (S.I. 1993/1247)
- Turks and Caicos Islands Constitution (Amendment) Order 1993 (S.I. 1993/1248)
- Income-related Benefits Schemes and Social Security (Recoupment) Amendment Regulations 1993 (S.I. 1993/1249)
- Access to Health Records (Northern Ireland) Order 1993 (S.I. 1993/1250)
- Aviation Security (Jersey) Order 1993 (S.I. 1993/1251)
- Financial Provisions (Northern Ireland) Order 1993 (S.I. 1993/1252)
- Serbia and Montenegro (United Nations Sanctions) (Channel Islands) Order 1993 (S.I. 1993/1253)
- Serbia and Montenegro (United Nations Sanctions) (Isle of Man) Order 1993 (S.I. 1993/1254)
- Maximum Number of Judges (No. 2) Order 1993 (S.I. 1993/1255)
- Arbitration (Foreign Awards) Order 1993 (S.I. 1993/1256)
- Designs (Convention Countries) Order 1993 (S.I. 1993/1257)
- Patents and Marks (Convention and Relevant Countries) Order 1993 S.I. 1993/1258)
- Hackney and Tower Hamlets (London Borough Boundaries) Order 1993 (S.I. 1993/1260)
- Bromley and Lewisham (London Borough Boundaries) Order 1993 (S.I. 1993/1261)
- Kensington and Chelsea and Westminster (London Borough Boundaries) Order 1993 (S.I. 1993/1262)
- Food Premises (Registration) (Welsh Form of Application) Regulations 1993 (S.I. 1993/1270)
- Greenwich and Lewisham (London Borough Boundaries) Order 1993 (S.I. 1993/1276)
- Ealing, Hillingdon and Hounslow (London Borough Boundaries) Order 1993 (S.I. 1993/1277)
- Treatment of Spruce Bark Order 1993 (S.I. 1993/1282)
- Plant Health (Forestry) (Great Britain) Order 1993 (S.I. 1993/1283)
- Prohibition of the Keeping or the Release of Live Fish (Pikeperch) (Scotland) Order 1993 (S.I. 1993/1288)
- A27 Trunk Road (Patching Junction Improvement) Order 1993 (S.I. 1993/1293)
- A27 Trunk Road (Patching Junction Improvement Slip Roads) Order 1993 (S.I. 1993/1294)
- A27 Trunk Road (Patching Junction Improvement) (Detrunking) Order 1993 (S.I. 1993/1295)

==== 1300–1399 ====
- Concession Statements (Prescribed Information) Regulations 1993 (S.I. 1993/1300)
- Gipsy Encampments (City of Hereford) Order 1993 (S.I. 1993/1301)
- South Wales Police (Amalgamation) (Amendment) (No. 2) Order 1993 (S.I. 1993/1302)
- Dyfed-Powys Police (Amalgamation) (Amendment) (No. 2) Order 1993 (S.I. 1993/1303)
- Seed Potatoes (Fees) (Scotland) Regulations 1993 (S.I. 1993/1311)
- Eastwood and East Kilbride Districts (Busby) Boundaries Amendment Order 1993 (S.I. 1993/1312)
- Margate Pier and Harbour Revision Order 1992 (SI 1993/1313)
- Integrated Administration and Control System Regulations 1993 (S.I. 1993/1317)
- Lewisham and Southwark (London Borough Boundaries) Order 1993 (S.I. 1993/1318)
- Greater London and Surrey (County and London Borough Boundaries) (No.3) Order 1993 (S.I. 1993/1319)
- Plant Health (Great Britain) Order 1993 (S.I. 1993/1320)
- Health and Safety (Fees) Regulations 1993 (S.I. 1993/1321)
- A500 Newcastle-Under-Lyme to Nantwich Trunk Road (Basford-Hough-Shavington Bypass and Slip Road) Order 1993 (S.I. 1993/1322)
- A500 Newcastle-Under-Lyme to Nantwich Trunk Road (Basford-Hough-Shavington Bypass) (Detrunking) Order 1993 (S.I. 1993/1323)
- Post Office (Abolition of Import Restrictions) Regulations 1993 (S.I. 1993/1324)
- Fishing Vessels (Safety Improvements) (Grants) Scheme 1993 (S.I. 1993/1325)
- Insurance Companies (Cancellation) Regulations 1993 (S.I. 1993/1327)
- Diseases of Animals (Therapeutic Substances) (Revocation) Order 1993 (S.I. 1993/1331)
- Foot-and-Mouth Disease (Sera and Glandular Products) (Revocation) Order 1993 (S.I. 1993/1332)
- Functions of Traffic Wardens (Amendment) Order 1993 (S.I. 1993/1334)
- Food Protection (Emergency Prohibitions) (Paralytic Shellfish Poisoning) Order 1993 (S.I. 1993/1338)
- Local Government (Committees) (Amendment) Regulations 1993 (S.I. 1993/1339)
- Merchant Shipping (Fees) (Amendment) Regulations 1993 (S.I. 1993/1340)
- Finance (No. 2) Act 1992 (Commencement No. 5) Order 1993 (S.I. 1993/1341)
- Heathrow Airport (County and London Borough Boundaries) Order 1993 (S.I. 1993/1342)
- Lambeth, Merton and Wandsworth (London Borough Boundaries) Order 1993 (S.I. 1993/1343)
- Fishing Vessels (Decommissioning) Scheme 1993 (S.I. 1993/1345)
- Ealing, Hammersmith and Fulham, and Hounslow (London Borough Boundaries) Order 1993 (S.I. 1993/1346)
- Tayside Regional Council (Backwater and Lintrathen Reservoirs) Byelaws Extension Order 1993 (S.I. 1993/1347)
- Unfair Dismissal (Increase of Compensation Limit) Order 1993 (S.I. 1993/1348)
- North and Central London (London Borough Boundaries) Order 1993 (S.I. 1993/1351)
- North London Boroughs (London Borough Boundaries) Order 1993 (S.I. 1993/1352)
- Customs and Excise (Transit) Regulations 1993 (S.I. 1993/1353)
- Civil Legal Aid (Scope) Regulations 1993 (S.I. 1993/1354)
- Act of Sederunt (Fees of Shorthand Writers in the Sheriff Court) 1993 (S.I. 1993/1355)
- Act of Sederunt (Rules of the Court of Session Amendment No.3) (Shorthand Writers' Fees) 1993 (S.I. 1993/1357)
- Haringey and Islington (London Borough Boundaries) Order 1993 (S.I. 1993/1358)
- Farmed Game Meat (Hygiene and Inspection) (Charges) Regulations 1993 (S.I. 1993/1359)
- Fresh Meat and Poultry Meat (Hygiene, Inspection and Examinations for Residues) (Charges) (Amendment) Regulations 1993 (S.I. 1993/1360)
- Pneumoconiosis, Byssinosis and Miscellaneous Diseases Benefit (Amendment) Scheme 1993 (S.I. 1993/1363)
- Combined Probation Areas (Devon) Order 1993 (S.I. 1993/1364)
- Barnet, Camden and Westminster (London Borough Boundaries) Order 1993 (S.I. 1993/1365)
- Crop Residues (Burning) Regulations 1993 (S.I. 1993/1366)
- Local Government Superannuation (Local Commissioners) Regulations 1993 (S.I. 1993/1367)
- National Health Service (Fund-Holding Practices) (Scotland) Amendment Regulations 1993 (S.I. 1993/1369)
- Lancashire County Council (Proposed Connecting Roads to M6 Motorway at Haighton) Special Roads Scheme 1992 Confirmation Instrument 1993 (S.I. 1993/1370)
- A17 Trunk Road (Leadenham Bypass) Order 1993 (S.I. 1993/1371)
- A17 Trunk Road (Leadenham Bypass) (Detrunking) Order 1993 (S.I. 1993/1372)
- King's Lynn—Newark Trunk Road (Leadenham By-pass and Slip Roads) Order 1973 (Revocation) Order 1993 (S.I. 1993/1373)
- Registered Restrictive Trading Agreements (Inspection, Copy and Certification) (Fees) Regulations 1993 (S.I. 1993/1376)
- Greater London and Surrey (County and London Borough Boundaries) (No.4) Order 1993 (S.I. 1993/1391)

==== 1400–1499 ====
- Valuation Timetable (Scotland) Amendment (No.2) Order 1993 (S.I. 1993/1400)
- Nene Valley Light Railway (Transfer) Order 1993 (S.I. 1993/1402)
- Home-Grown Cereals Authority (Rate of Levy) Order 1993 (S.I. 1993/1405)
- Offshore Installations (Safety Zones) Order 1993 (S.I. 1993/1406)
- High Court and County Courts Jurisdiction (Amendment) Order 1993 (S.I. 1993/1407)
- Foreign Fields (Specification) Order 1993 (S.I. 1993/1408)
- Aeroplane Noise (Limitation on Operation of Aeroplanes) Regulations 1993 (S.I. 1993/1409)
- Fire Safety and Safety of Places of Sport Act 1987 (Commencement No. 7) Order 1993 (S.I. 1993/1411)
- Sports Grounds and Sporting Events (Designation) (Scotland) Amendment Order 1993 (S.I. 1993/1412)
- Food Protection (Emergency Prohibitions) (Paralytic Shellfish Poisoning) (No. 2) Order 1993 (S.I. 1993/1413)
- Removal, Storage and Disposal of Vehicles (Prescribed Sums and Charges etc.) (Amendment) (No. 2) Regulations 1993 (S.I. 1993/1415)
- Goods Vehicles (Operators' Licences) (Temporary Use in Great Britain) (Amendment) Regulations 1993 (S.I. 1993/1416)
- Hackney, Haringey and Islington (London Borough Boundaries) Order 1993 (S.I. 1993/1417)
- Non-Domestic Rating Act 1993 (Commencement No. 1) Order 1993 (S.I. 1993/1418)
- Suckler Cow Premium Regulations 1993 (S.I. 1993/1441)
- Feeding Stuffs (Amendment) Regulations 1993 (S.I. 1993/1442)
- East London Boroughs (London Borough Boundaries) Order 1993 (S.I. 1993/1443)
- East London Boroughs (London Borough Boundaries) (No. 2) Order 1993 (S.I. 1993/1444)
- City and London Borough Boundaries Order 1993 (S.I. 1993/1445)
- Trade Effluent (Asbestos) (Scotland) Regulations 1993 (S.I. 1993/1446)
- Parking Attendants (Wearing of Uniforms) (London) Regulations 1993 (S.I. 1993/1450)
- Harbour Authorities (Variation of Constitution) Order 1993 (S.I. 1993/1451)
- Housing Renovation etc. Grants (Prescribed Forms and Particulars) (Amendment) (No. 2) Regulations 1993 (S.I. 1993/1452)
- County Council of Clwyd (A525 St Asaph—Rhyl Road, Rhuddlan Bypass Stage II) River Clwyd Bridge Scheme 1992 Confirmation Instrument 1993 (S.I. 1993/1456)
- Building Standards (Scotland) Amendment Regulations 1993 (S.I. 1993/1457)
- Borders Region (Electoral Arrangements) Order 1993 (S.I. 1993/1458)
- Road Traffic Act 1991 (Commencement No. 6 and Transitional Provisions) Order 1993 (S.I. 1993/1461)
- Hoole Island Junction (M53/A56) Chester (Detrunking) Order 1993 (S.I. 1993/1462)
- Road Traffic (Special Parking Areas) (The London Borough of Wandsworth) Order 1993 (S.I. 1993/1474)
- Removal and Disposal of Vehicles (Amendment) (No. 2) Regulations 1993 (S.I. 1993/1475)
- Food Protection (Emergency Prohibitions) (Paralytic Shellfish Poisoning) (No. 3) Order 1993 (S.I. 1993/1476)
- Plant Health Fees (Scotland) Order 1993 (S.I. 1993/1477)
- A11 Trunk Road (A505 Junction to Four Went Ways Improvement and Slip Roads) Order 1993 (S.I. 1993/1478)
- A11 Trunk Road (A505 Junction to Four Went Ways) (Detrunking) Order 1993 (S.I. 1993/1479)
- Council Tax Limitation (England) (Maximum Amounts) Order 1993 (S.I. 1993/1480)
- Food Protection (Emergency Prohibitions) (Paralytic Shellfish Poisoning) (No.4) Order 1993 (S.I. 1993/1483)
- A11 Trunk Road (Stump Cross to A505 Junction Improvement) Slip Roads Order 1993 (S.I. 1993/1484)
- M11 Motorway (Stump Cross Junction Improvement) and Connecting Roads Scheme 1993 (S.I. 1993/1485)
- A11 Trunk Road (Stump Cross to A505 Junction Improvement) (Detrunking) Order 1993 (S.I. 1993/1486)
- Firearms (Dangerous Air Weapons) (Amendment) Rules 1993 (S.I. 1993/1490)
- Education (Schools) Act 1992 (Commencement No. 3) Order 1993 (S.I. 1993/1491)
- Education (School Inspection) Regulations 1993 (S.I. 1993/1492)
- Non-Domestic Rating (Collection and Enforcement) (Local Lists) (Amendment) Regulations 1993 (S.I. 1993/1493)
- Non-Domestic Rating (Collection and Enforcement) (Central Lists) (Amendment) Regulations 1993 (S.I. 1993/1494)
- Non-Domestic Rating (Payment of Interest) (Amendment) Regulations 1993 (S.I. 1993/1495)
- Non-Domestic Rating Contributions (England) (Amendment) Regulations 1993 (S.I. 1993/1496)

=== 1500-1999 ===
==== 1500–1599 ====
- Local Authorities' Traffic Orders (Procedure) (England and Wales) (Amendment) Regulations 1993 (S.I. 1993/1500)
- A4074 Trunk Road (Crowmarsh Bypass) (Detrunking) Order 1993 (S.I. 1993/1501)
- Education (School Information)(England) Regulations 1993 (S.I. 1993/1502)
- Education (School Performance Information) (England) Regulations 1993 (S.I. 1993/1503)
- Non-Domestic Rating Contributions (Wales) (Amendment) Regulations 1993 (S.I. 1993/1505)
- Non-Domestic Rating (Demand Notices) (Wales) (Amendment) Regulations 1993 (S.I. 1993/1506)
- Value Added Tax (Supply of Services) Order 1993 (S.I. 1993/1507)
- Rent Act 1977 (Forms etc.) (Welsh Forms and Particulars) Regulations 1993 (S.I. 1993/1511)
- Non-Domestic Rating Act 1993 (Commencement No. 2) Order 1993 (S.I. 1993/1512)
- Food Protection (Emergency Prohibitions) (Paralytic Shellfish Poisoning) (No.5) Order 1993 (S.I. 1993/1515)
- Charging Orders (Residential Accommodation) (Scotland) Order 1993 (S.I. 1993/1516)
- Financial Assistance for Environmental Purposes (No. 2) Order 1993 (S.I. 1993/1518)
- Egg Products Regulations 1993 (S.I. 1993/1520)
- Gas (Meters) (Amendment) Regulations 1993 (S.I. 1993/1521)
- Northern Ireland (Emergency and Prevention of Terrorism Provisions) (Continuance) Order 1993 (S.I. 1993/1522)
- Food Protection (Emergency Prohibitions) (Paralytic Shellfish Poisoning) (No.6) Order 1993 (S.I. 1993/1523)
- Education (School Inspection) (Wales) Regulations 1993 (S.I. 1993/1529)
- Cosmetic Products (Safety) (Amendment)Regulations 1993 (S.I. 1993/1539)
- Income-related Benefits Schemes (Miscellaneous Amendments) (No. 3) Regulations 1993 (S.I. 1993/1540)
- Firearms (Dangerous Air Weapons) (Scotland) Amendment Rules 1993 (S.I. 1993/1541)
- First Community National Health Service Trust (Change of Name) Order 1993 (S.I. 1993/1543)
- Mental Health Foundation of Mid Staffordshire National Health Service Trust (Change of Name) Order 1993 (S.I. 1993/1544)
- Special Trustees for the Royal London Hospital (Transfer of Trust Property) Order 1993 (S.I. 1993/1545)
- Child Resistant Packaging (Safety) (Amendment) Regulations 1993 (S.I. 1993/1546)
- Toys (Safety)(Amendment) Regulations 1993 (S.I. 1993/1547)
- Addenbrooke's National Health Service Trust (Transfer of Trust Property) Order 1993 (S.I. 1993/1564)
- Foreign Fields (Specification) (Amendment) Order 1993 (S.I. 1993/1565)
- Foreign Fields (Specification) (No. 2) Order 1993 (S.I. 1993/1566)
- Reconstitution of the Dearne and Dove Internal Drainage Board Order 1993 (S.I. 1993/1570)
- European Communities (Designation)(No. 2) Order 1993 (S.I. 1993/1571)
- House of Commons Disqualification Order 1993 (S.I. 1993/1572)
- Child Abduction and Custody (Parties to Conventions) (Amendment) (No. 2) Order 1993 (S.I. 1993/1573)
- Extradition (Hijacking) (Amendment) Order 1993 (S.I. 1993/1574)
- Iraq (United Nations) (Sequestration of Assets) (Isle of Man) Order 1993 (S.I. 1993/1575)
- Family Law (Northern Ireland) Order 1993 (S.I. 1993/1576)
- Family Law (Northern Ireland Consequential Amendments) Order 1993 (S.I. 1993/1577)
- Fire Services (Amendment) (Northern Ireland) Order 1993 (S.I. 1993/1578)
- Social Security (Amendment) (Northern Ireland) Order 1993 (S.I. 1993/1579)
- Merchant Shipping (Prevention of Oil Pollution) (Amendment) Order 1993 (S.I. 1993/1580)
- Merchant Shipping (Prevention of Pollution by Garbage) (Amendment) Order 1993 (S.I. 1993/1581)
- International Carriage of Perishable Foodstuffs (Amendment) Regulations 1993 (S.I. 1993/1589)
- Swavesey Internal Drainage Board Award Drains Variation Order 1993 (S.I. 1993/1590)
- Wireless Telegraphy (Short Range Devices) (Exemption) Regulations 1993 (S.I. 1993/1591)
- Montrose Harbour Revision Order 1993 (S.I. 1993/1592)
- Local Government Superannuation (Scotland) Amendment Regulations 1993 (S.I. 1993/1593)
- Severn Bridge Regulations 1993 (S.I. 1993/1595)

==== 1600–1699 ====
- Department of Transport (Fees) (Amendment) Order 1993 (S.I. 1993/1601)
- Motor Vehicles (Driving Licences) (Amendment) Regulations 1993 (S.I. 1993/1602)
- Motor Vehicles (Driving Licences) (Large Goods and Passenger-Carrying Vehicles) (Amendment) Regulations 1993 (S.I. 1993/1603)
- Education (School and Placing Information) (Scotland) Amendment, Etc., Regulations 1993 (S.I. 1993/1604)
- Education (Provision of Information as to Schools) (Scotland) Regulations 1993 (S.I. 1993/1605)
- Food Protection (Emergency Prohibitions) (Paralytic Shellfish Poisoning) (No.7) Order 1993 (S.I. 1993/1606)
- Swanage Light Railway (Extension) Order 1993 (S.I. 1993/1607)
- Council Tax Limitation (Wales) (Maximum Amount) Order 1993 (S.I. 1993/1608)
- Further Education (Prescription of Different Date for Property Agreements) (Scotland) Order 1993 (S.I. 1993/1614)
- Health Boards (Membership and Procedure) (No. 2) Amendment Regulations 1993 (S.I. 1993/1615)
- Education (Student Loans) (Amendment) Regulations 1993 (S.I. 1993/1620)
- Community Action (Miscellaneous Provisions) Order 1993 (S.I. 1993/1621)
- Air Navigation (General) Regulations 1993 (S.I. 1993/1622)
- Debts of Overseas Governments (Determination of Relevant Percentage) (Amendment) Regulations 1993 (S.I. 1993/1623)
- Charities (Exemption from Accounting Requirements) (Scotland) Regulations 1993 (S.I. 1993/1624)
- Right to Purchase (Prescribed Persons) (Scotland) Order 1993 (S.I. 1993/1625)
- Sheep Annual Premium and Suckler Cow Premium Quotas Regulations 1993 (S.I. 1993/1626)
- Castle Vale Housing Action Trust (Area and Constitution) Order 1993 (S.I. 1993/1634)
- Gipsy Encampments (Borough of Surrey Heath) Order 1993 (S.I. 1993/1635)
- Tower Hamlets Housing Action Trust (Area and Constitution) Order 1993 (S.I. 1993/1636)
- Value Added Tax (General) (Amendment) (No. 5) Regulations 1993 (S.I. 1993/1639)
- Reconstitution of the Witham First District Internal Drainage Board Order 1993 (S.I. 1993/1640)
- Import (Plant Health Fees) (England and Wales) Order 1993 (S.I. 1993/1641)
- Plant Passport (Plant Health Fees) (England and Wales) Regulations 1993 (S.I. 1993/1642)
- Environmental Protection (Controls on Injurious Substances) (No. 2) Regulations 1993 (S.I. 1993/1643)
- Alcan Aluminium UK Ltd. (Rateable Values) (Scotland) Order 1993 (S.I. 1993/1644)
- Forth Ports plc (Rateable Values) (Scotland) Order 1993 (S.I. 1993/1645)
- Caledonian MacBrayne Limited (Rateable Values) (Scotland) Order 1993 (S.I. 1993/1646)
- Tunbridge Wells and Eridge Light Railway Order 1993 (S.I. 1993/1651)
- Asylum and Immigration Appeals Act 1993 (Commencement and Transitional Provisions) Order 1993 (S.I. 1993/1655)
- Immigration (Restricted Right of Appeal against Deportation) (Exemption) Order 1993 (S.I. 1993/1656)
- Immigration (Variation of Leave) (Amendment) Order 1993 (S.I. 1993/1657)
- Extraction Solvents in Food Regulations 1993 (S.I. 1993/1658)
- Education (Assisted Places) (Scotland) Amendment Regulations 1993 (S.I. 1993/1659)
- St Mary's Music School (Aided Places) Amendment Regulations 1993 (S.I. 1993/1660)
- Asylum Appeals (Procedure) Rules 1993 (S.I. 1993/1661)
- Immigration Appeals (Procedure) (Amendment) Rules 1993 (S.I. 1993/1662)
- Offshore Installations (Safety Zones) (No. 2) Order 1993 (S.I. 1993/1664)
- Recreation Grounds (Revocation of Parish Council Byelaws) Order 1993 (S.I. 1993/1665)
- Merchant Shipping (Fees) (Amendment) (No. 2) Regulations 1993 (S.I. 1993/1676)
- Export of Goods (Control) (Haiti) Order 1993 (S.I. 1993/1677)
- Immigration (Transit Visa) Order 1993 (S.I. 1993/1678)
- Income Support (General) Amendment No. 3 Regulations 1993 (S.I. 1993/1679)
- Merchant Shipping (Prevention of Oil Pollution) (Amendment) Regulations 1993 (S.I. 1993/1680)
- Merchant Shipping (Prevention of Pollution by Garbage) (Amendment) Regulations 1993 (S.I. 1993/1681)
- Diseases of Animals (Seizure) Order 1993 (S.I. 1993/1685)
- Road Traffic Act 1991 (Commencement No. 6 and Transitional Provisions) (Amendment) Order 1993 (S.I. 1993/1686)
- Football Spectators Act 1989 (Commencement No. 4) Order 1993 (S.I. 1993/1690)
- Football Spectators (Designation of Football Matches in England and Wales) Order 1993 (S.I. 1993/1691)
- Export of Goods (Control) (Amendment No. 2) Order 1993 (S.I. 1993/1692)
- Road Traffic Offenders (Prescribed Devices) Order 1993 (S.I. 1993/1698)

==== 1700–1799 ====
- A249 Trunk Road (Brielle Way/Docks Entrance) Order 1993 (S.I. 1993/1700)
- Craigie College of Education (Closure) (Scotland) Order 1993 (S.I. 1993/1701)
- Supply of Razors and Razor Blades (Interim Provision) (Revocation) Order 1993 (S.I. 1993/1702)
- Merger Situation (Stora/Swedish Match/Gillette) (Interim Provision) (Revocation) Order 1993 (S.I. 1993/1703)
- Land Registration (Charities) Rules 1993 (S.I. 1993/1704)
- A65 Trunk Road (Gargrave Bypass) Order 1990 Amendment and New Trunk Road Order 1993 (S.I. 1993/1705)
- A65 Trunk Road (Horse Pasture Laithe to Heber Barn) (Detrunking) Order 1993 (S.I. 1993/1706)
- Removal and Disposal of Vehicles(Amendment) (No. 3) Regulations 1993 (S.I. 1993/1708)
- Inshore Fishing (Prohibition of Fishing for Cockles) (Scotland) Order 1993 (S.I. 1993/1709)
- Motor Vehicles (Designation of Approval Marks) (Amendment) Regulations 1993 (S.I. 1993/1710)
- Plant Breeders' Rights (Trees, Shrubs and Woody Climbers) (Variation) Scheme 1993 (S.I. 1993/1733)
- Beef Special Premium Regulations 1993 (S.I. 1993/1734)
- Reconstitution of the Upper Witham Internal Drainage Board Order 1993 (S.I. 1993/1738)
- Social Security (Introduction of Disability Living Allowance) (Amendment) (No.2) Regulations 1993 (S.I. 1993/1739)
- Kent and East Sussex (County Boundaries) Order 1993 (S.I. 1993/1742)
- Coal Industry (Restructuring Grants) Order 1993 (S.I. 1993/1745)
- Chemicals (Hazard Information and Packaging) Regulations 1993 (S.I. 1993/1746)
- A35 Trunk Road (Tolpuddle to Puddletown Bypass and Slip Roads) Order 1993 (S.I. 1993/1747)
- A35 Trunk Road (Tolpuddle to Puddletown Bypass) (Detrunking) Order 1993 (S.I. 1993/1748)
- Environmental Protection (Prescribed Processes and Substances) (Amendment) Regulations 1993 (S.I. 1993/1749)
- Northern Ireland Act 1974 (Interim Period Extension) Order 1993 (S.I. 1993/1753)
- Social Security (Unemployment, Sickness and Invalidity Benefit) Amendment Regulations 1993 (S.I. 1993/1754)
- Education (School Teachers' Pay and Conditions) (No. 2) Order 1993 (S.I. 1993/1755)
- Civil Legal Aid (General) (Amendment) (No. 2) Regulations 1993 (S.I. 1993/1756)
- North Circular Trunk Road (A406) and A1400 Trunk Road (Waltham Forest and Redbridge) (Speed Limits) Order 1993 (S.I. 1993/1757)
- Road Vehicles (Registration and Licensing) (Amendment) Regulations (Northern Ireland) 1993 (S.I. 1993/1759)
- Road Vehicles (Registration and Licensing) (Amendment) Regulations 1993 (S.I. 1993/1760)
- Bradford Community Health National Health Service Trust (Transfer of Trust Property) Order 1993 (S.I. 1993/1761)
- Bradford Hospitals National Health Service Trust (Transfer of Trust Property) Order 1993 (S.I. 1993/1762)
- Chesterfield and North Derbyshire Royal Hospital National Health Service Trust (Transfer of Trust Property) Order 1993 (S.I. 1993/1763)
- Doncaster Royal Infirmary and Montagu Hospital National Health Service Trust (Transfer of Trust Property) Order 1993 (S.I. 1993/1764)
- Eastbourne and County Healthcare National Health Service Trust (Transfer of Trust Property) Order 1993 (S.I. 1993/1765)
- Northern Devon Healthcare National Health Service Trust (Transfer of Trust Property) Order 1993 (S.I. 1993/1766)
- South Buckinghamshire National Health Service Trust (Transfer of Trust Property) Order 1993 (S.I. 1993/1767)
- South Worcestershire Community National Health Service Trust (Transfer of Trust Property) Order 1993 (S.I. 1993/1768)
- Commons Registration (Disposal of Disputed Registrations) (Amendment) Regulations 1993 (S.I. 1993/1771)
- Civil Defence (General Local Authority Functions) (Scotland) Regulations 1993 (S.I. 1993/1774)
- Education (Bursaries for Teacher Training) (Amendment) Regulations 1993 (S.I. 1993/1775)
- Gipsy Encampments (District of South Cambridgeshire) Order 1993 (S.I. 1993/1776)
- Local Government Finance Act 1992 (Recovery of Community Charge) Saving Order 1993 (S.I. 1993/1780)
- Consular Fees (Amendment) Order 1993 (S.I. 1993/1781)
- Continental Shelf (Designation of Areas) (No. 2) Order 1993 (S.I. 1993/1782)
- European Communities (Definition of Treaties) (Agreement on Customs Union and Co-operation between the European Economic Community and the Republic of San Marino) Order 1993 (S.I. 1993/1783)
- Haiti (United Nations Sanctions) Order 1993 (S.I. 1993/1784)
- Haiti (United Nations Sanctions) (Dependent Territories) Order 1993 (S.I. 1993/1785)
- Merchant Shipping Act 1979 (Overseas Territories) (Amendment) Order 1993 (S.I. 1993/1786)
- United Nations Arms Embargoes (Liberia, Somalia and the Former Yugoslavia) Order 1993 (S.I. 1993/1787)
- Appropriation (No. 2) (Northern Ireland) Order 1993 (S.I. 1993/1788)
- British Nationality (Hong Kong) (Selection Scheme) (Amendment) Order 1993 (S.I. 1993/1789)
- Criminal Justice Act 1988 (Designated Countries and Territories) (Amendment) Order 1993 (S.I. 1993/1790)
- Criminal Justice (International Co-operation) Act 1990 (Enforcement of Overseas Forfeiture Orders) (Amendment) Order 1993 (S.I. 1993/1791)
- Drug Trafficking Offences Act 1986 (Designated Countries and Territories) (Amendment) Order 1993 (S.I. 1993/1792)
- Haiti (United Nations Sanctions) (Channel Islands) Order 1993 (S.I. 1993/1793)
- Haiti (United Nations Sanctions)(Isle of Man) Order 1993 (S.I. 1993/1794)
- Hong Kong (British Nationality) (Amendment) Order 1993 (S.I. 1993/1795)
- Immigration (Guernsey) Order 1993 (S.I. 1993/1796)
- Immigration (Jersey) Order 1993 (S.I. 1993/1797)
- Iraq (United Nations) (Sequestration of Assets) (Guernsey) Order 1993 (S.I. 1993/1798)
- Iraq (United Nations) (Sequestration of Assets) (Jersey) Order 1993 (S.I. 1993/1799)

==== 1800–1899 ====
- Double Taxation Relief (Taxes on Income) (Ghana) Order 1993 (S.I. 1993/1800)
- Double Taxation Relief (Taxes on Income) (India) Order 1993 (S.I. 1993/1801)
- Double Taxation Relief (Taxes on Income) (Uganda) Order 1993 (S.I. 1993/1802)
- Double Taxation Relief (Taxes on Income) (Ukraine) Order 1993 (S.I. 1993/1803)
- Army, Air Force and Naval Discipline Acts (Continuation) Order 1993 (S.I. 1993/1804)
- Films Co-Production Agreements (Amendment) Order 1993 (S.I. 1993/1805)
- Confiscation of the Proceeds of Drug Trafficking (Designated Countries and Territories) (Scotland) Amendment Order 1993 (S.I. 1993/1806)
- Criminal Justice (International Co-operation) Act 1990 (Enforcement of Overseas Forfeiture Orders) (Scotland) Amendment Order 1993 (S.I. 1993/1807)
- Development Board for Rural Wales (Transfer of Housing Stock) Regulations 1993 (S.I. 1993/1808)
- Civil Courts (Amendment) Order 1993 (S.I. 1993/1809)
- Local Government Superannuation (National Rivers Authority) Regulations 1993 (S.I. 1993/1810)
- Cardiothoracic Centre–Liverpool National Health Service Trust (Establishment) Amendment Order 1993 (S.I. 1993/1811)
- Civil Defence (General Local Authority Functions) Regulations 1993 (S.I. 1993/1812)
- Channel Tunnel (International Arrangements) Order 1993 (S.I. 1993/1813)
- Local Government Superannuation (Part-time Employees) Regulations 1993 (S.I. 1993/1814)
- Disclosure of Interests in Shares (Amendment) Regulations 1993 (S.I. 1993/1819)
- Partnerships and Unlimited Companies (Accounts) Regulations 1993 (S.I. 1993/1820)
- Income Tax (Interest Relief) (Qualifying Lenders) (No. 2) Order 1993 (S.I. 1993/1821)
- Occupational Pension Schemes (Preservation of Benefit) Amendment Regulations 1993 (S.I. 1993/1822)
- Offshore Safety (Repeals and Modifications) Regulations 1993 (S.I. 1993/1823)
- Export of Goods (Control) (Amendment No. 4) Order 1993 (S.I. 1993/1825)
- Financial Services (Disclosure of Information) (Designated Authorities) (No. 7) Order 1993 (S.I. 1993/1826)
- Church of England (Legal Aid) Rules 1993 (S.I. 1993/1840)
- Diocesan Chancellorship Regulations 1993 (S.I. 1993/1841)
- Ecclesiastical Judges and Legal Officers (Fees) Order 1993 (S.I. 1993/1842)
- Legal Officers (Annual Fees) Order 1993 (S.I. 1993/1843)
- Parochial Fees Order 1993 (S.I. 1993/1844)
- Local Government Superannuation (Investments) Regulations 1993 (S.I. 1993/1848)
- Highways (Traffic Calming) Regulations 1993 (S.I. 1993/1849)
- Education (Mandatory Awards) Regulations 1993 (S.I. 1993/1850)
- Social Security (Invalid Care Allowance) Amendment (No. 2) Regulations 1993 (S.I. 1993/1851)
- Assisted Areas Order 1993 (S.I. 1993/1877)
- Seed Potatoes (Amendment) Regulations 1993 (S.I. 1993/1878)
- Public Telecommunication System Designation (City of London Telecommunications Ltd) Order 1993 (S.I. 1993/1879)
- Public Telecommunication System Designation (Ionica L3 Ltd) Order 1993 (S.I. 1993/1880)
- Companies Act 1989 (Recognised Supervisory Bodies) (Periodical Fees) Regulations 1993 (S.I. 1993/1881)
- Learning for Work (Scottish Enterprise and Highlands and Islands Enterprise Programmes) Order 1993 (S.I. 1993/1882)
- Norway Lobsters (Prohibition of Method of Fishing) Order 1993 (S.I. 1993/1887)
- Occupational Pension Schemes (Public Service Pension Schemes) (Amendment) Regulations 1993 (S.I. 1993/1888)
- Magistrates' Courts Fees (Amendment) Order 1993 (S.I. 1993/1889)
- Medicines (Products Other Than Veterinary Dmgs) (Prescription Only) Amendment Order 1993 (S.I. 1993/1890)
- Colleges of Further Education (Changes of Names) (Scotland) Order 1993 (S.I. 1993/1891)
- Education (Access Funds) (Scotland) Amendment Regulations 1993 (S.I. 1993/1892)
- Offshore Installations (Safety Zones)(No. 3) Order 1993 (S.I. 1993/1893)
- Assisted Areas (Amendment) Order 1993 (S.I. 1993/1894)
- Legal Aid in Criminal and Care Proceedings (General) (Amendment) (No. 2) Regulations 1993 (S.I. 1993/1895)
- Neath—Abergavenny Trunk Road (A465) (Improvement from Aberdulais to Glynneath, Aberdulais Slip Roads) Order 1993 (S.I. 1993/1896)
- Management and Administration of Safety and Health at Mines Regulations 1993 (S.I. 1993/1897)
- Poultry Breeding Flocks and Hatcheries Order 1993 (S.I. 1993/1898)
- Meat and Livestock Commission Levy (Variation) Scheme (Confirmation) Order 1993 (S.I. 1993/1899)

==== 1900–1999 ====
- Local Government (Scotland) Act 1975 (Local Authority Borrowing Limit) Order 1993 (S.I. 1993/1900)
- Nurses, Midwives and Health Visitors (Entry to Examinations and Training Requirements) Amendment Rules Approval Order 1993 (S.I. 1993/1901)
- Trade Union Reform and Employment Rights Act 1993 (Commencement No. 1 and Transitional Provisions) Order 1993 (S.I. 1993/1908)
- Trade Union Ballots and Elections (Independent Scrutineer Qualifications) Order 1993 (S.I. 1993/1909)
- Teddington Memorial Hospital National Health Service Trust (Establishment) Amendment Order 1993 (S.I. 1993/1932)
- Money Laundering Regulations 1993 (S.I. 1993/1933)
- Public Telecommunication System Designation (Scottish Hydro-Electric plc) Order 1993 (S.I. 1993/1934)
- Public Telecommunication System Designation (Energis Communications Limited) Order 1993 (S.I. 1993/1935)
- Education (Assisted Places) (Amendment) Regulations 1993 (S.I. 1993/1936)
- Education (Assisted Places) (Incidental Expenses) (Amendment) Regulations 1993 (S.I. 1993/1937)
- Education (Grants) (Music and Ballet Schools) (Amendment) Regulations 1993 (S.I. 1993/1938)
- Social Security (Disability Living Allowance) (Amendment) Regulations 1993 (S.I. 1993/1939)
- Food Protection (Emergency Prohibitions) (Paralytic Shellfish Poisoning) (No.4 and No.7) Orders 1993 Revocation Order 1993 (S.I. 1993/1940)
- Value Added Tax (General) (Amendment) (No. 6) Regulations 1993 (S.I. 1993/1941)
- Road Vehicles (Construction and Use) (Amendment) (No. 1) Regulations 1993 (S.I. 1993/1946)
- Tobacco Products Labelling (Safety) Amendment Regulations 1993 (S.I. 1993/1947)
- Learning for Work (Miscellaneous Provisions) Order 1993 (S.I. 1993/1949)
- Act of Adjournal (Consolidation Amendment) (Courses for Drink-drive Offenders) 1993 (S.I. 1993/1955)
- Act of Sederunt (Sheriff Court Ordinary Cause Rules) 1993 (S.I. 1993/1956)
- Double Taxation Relief (Taxes on Income) (General) (Manufactured Overseas Dividends) Regulations 1993 (S.I. 1993/1957)
- Dartford–Thurrock Crossing (Amendment) Regulations 1993 (S.I. 1993/1961)
- Harwich Haven Harbour Revision Order 1993 (S.I. 1993/1962)
- A4 Trunk Road (Great West Road, Hounslow) (Prescribed Routes) Order 1993 (S.I. 1993/1963)
- London South Circular Trunk Road (A205) (Westhorne Avenue, Lewisham) (Prohibition of Use of Gaps in Central Reserve) Order 1993 (S.I. 1993/1964)
- Civil Aviation (Route Charges for Navigation Services) Regulations 1993 (S.I. 1993/1965)
- Importation of Bovine Semen (Amendment) Regulations 1993 (S.I. 1993/1966)
- Animals and Animal Products (Import and Export) (Amendment) Regulations 1993 (S.I. 1993/1967)
- Criminal Justice Act 1993 (Commencement No. 1) Order 1993 (S.I. 1993/1968)
- Education (Teachers) (Amendment) Regulations 1993 (S.I. 1993/1969)
- Clyde Port Authority (Dissolution) Order 1993 (S.I. 1993/1970)
- Education Act 1993 (Commencement No. 1 and Transitional Provisions) Order 1993 (S.I. 1993/1975)
- Education (London Oratory School) (Exemption from Pay and Conditions Orders) Order 1993 (S.I. 1993/1976)
- Further Education (Attribution of Surpluses and Deficits) (The Ridge College) Regulations 1993 (S.I. 1993/1977)
- County Court (Pensions Ombudsman) (Enforcement of Directions and Determinations) Rules 1993 (S.I. 1993/1978)
- Education (School Inspection) (Wales) (No. 2) Regulations 1993 (S.I. 1993/1982)
- Education (National Curriculum) (Assessment Arrangements for the Core Subjects) (Key Stage 1) Order 1993 (S.I. 1993/1983)
- Education (National Curriculum) (Assessment Arrangements for the Core Subjects) (Key Stage 3) Order 1993 (S.I. 1993/1984)
- Social Security (Industrial Injuries) (Prescribed Diseases) Amendment (No. 2) Regulations 1993 (S.I. 1993/1985)
- Education (School Inspection) (No. 2) Regulations 1993 (S.I. 1993/1986)
- Education (Further Education in Schools) Regulations 1993 (S.I. 1993/1987)
- A27 Trunk Road (Polegate Bypass Slip Roads) Order 1993 (S.I. 1993/1990)
- A27 Trunk Road (Polegate Bypass De-Trunking)Order 1993 (S.I. 1993/1991)
- A259 Trunk Road Brookland Diversion Order 1993 (S.I. 1993/1992)
- Education (Further Education Institutions Information) (England) Regulations 1993 (S.I. 1993/1993)
- Merchant Shipping (Load Lines) Act 1967 (Unregistered Ships) Order 1993 (S.I. 1993/1994)
- Poultry Breeding Flocks, Hatcheries and Processed Animal Protein (Fees) Order 1993 (S.I. 1993/1998)

=== 2000-2499 ===
==== 2000–2099 ====
- Value Added Tax (Payments on Account) Order 1993 (S.I. 1993/2001)
- Friendly Societies Appeal Tribunal Regulations 1993 (S.I. 1993/2002)
- Income Tax (Stock Lending) (Amendment) Regulations 1993 (S.I. 1993/2003)
- Income Tax (Manufactured Overseas Dividends) Regulations 1993 (S.I. 1993/2004)
- Cereal Seeds Regulations 1993 (S.I. 1993/2005)
- Beet Seeds Regulations 1993 (S.I. 1993/2006)
- Oil and Fibre Plant Seeds Regulations 1993 (S.I. 1993/2007)
- Vegetable Seeds Regulations 1993 (S.I. 1993/2008)
- Fodder Plant Seeds Regulations 1993 (S.I. 1993/2009)
- Tuberculosis (Deer) (Amendment) Order 1993 (S.I. 1993/2010)
- Local Government Superannuation (Scotland) Amendment (No.2) Regulations 1993 (S.I. 1993/2013)
- Local Authorities (Capital Finance) (Amendment) (No. 2) Regulations 1993 (S.I. 1993/2014)
- Fishing Boats (Marking and Documentation) (Enforcement) Order 1993 (S.I. 1993/2015)
- Sea Fishing (Enforcement of Community Control Measures) Order 1993 (S.I. 1993/2016)
- Food Premises (Registration) Amendment Regulations 1993 (S.I. 1993/2022)
- Criminal Justice Act 1993 (Commencement No. 2 Transitional Provisions and Savings) (Scotland) Order 1993 (S.I. 1993/2035)
- Public Trusts (Reorganisation) (Scotland) Regulations 1993 (S.I. 1993/2036)
- Agricultural Holdings (Units of Production) Order 1993 (S.I. 1993/2037)
- Agriculture Act 1993 (Commencement No. 1) Order 1993 (S.I. 1993/2038)
- Agriculture Act 1993 (Specification of Year) (Potato Target Area) Order 1993 (S.I. 1993/2039)
- International Development Association (Tenth Replenishment) Order 1993 (S.I. 1993/2046)
- Police (Amendment) (No.3) Regulations 1993 (S.I. 1993/2047)
- Goods Vehicles (Plating and Testing) (Amendment) Regulations 1993 (S.I. 1993/2048)
- National Health Service (Travelling Expenses and Remission of Charges) (Scotland) Amendment (No.2) Regulations 1993 (S.I. 1993/2049)
- Prisoners and Criminal Proceedings (Scotland) Act 1993 Commencement, Transitional Provisions and Savings Order 1993 (S.I. 1993/2050)
- A34 Trunk Road (A34/M4 Junction 13 Improvement) Line and Slip Roads Order 1993 (S.I. 1993/2056)
- A6 Trunk Road (Great Glen Bypass) Order 1993 (S.I. 1993/2057)
- A6 Trunk Road (Great Glen Bypass) (Detrunking) Order 1993 (S.I. 1993/2058)
- Easington Lagoons (Area of Special Protection) (No.2) Order 1993 (S.I. 1993/2059)
- Capacity Serving Measures (Intoxicating Liquor) (Amendment) Regulations 1993 (S.I. 1993/2060)
- Enforcement of Road Traffic Debts (Certificated Bailiffs) Regulations 1993 (S.I. 1993/2072)
- Enforcement of Road Traffic Debts Order 1993 (S.I. 1993/2073)
- Education (School Performance Information) (England) (No. 2) Regulations 1993 (S.I. 1993/2077)
- Housing Renovation etc. Grants (Prescribed Forms and Particulars) (Welsh Forms and Particulars) (Amendment) (No. 2) Regulations 1993 (S.I. 1993/2078)
- Lerwick Harbour Revision Order 1993 (S.I. 1993/2087)
- Safety of Sports Grounds (Designation) Order 1993 (S.I. 1993/2090)
- Essex and Greater London (County Boundaries) Order 1993 (S.I. 1993/2091)
- Social Security (Contributions) Amendment (No. 6) Regulations 1993 (S.I. 1993/2094)
- Local Authorities (Goods and Services) (Public Bodies) Order 1993 (S.I. 1993/2097)
- Gipsy Encampments (District of South Shropshire) Order 1993 (S.I. 1993/2098)

==== 2100–2199 ====
- Animals (Scientific Procedures) Act (Amendment) Regulations 1993 (S.I. 1993/2102)
- Animals (Scientific Procedures) Act(Amendment) Order 1993 (S.I. 1993/2103)
- Closure of Prisons (H.M. Young Offender Institution Campsfield House) Order 1993 (S.I. 1993/2104)
- Gas (Authorisation Application) (Amendment) Regulations 1993 (S.I. 1993/2105)
- Nurses, Midwives and Health Visitors (Midwives Amendment) Rules Approval Order 1993 (S.I. 1993/2106)
- London South Circular Trunk Road (A205)(Thurlow Park Road, Lambeth) (Prohibition of Right Turn) Order 1993 (S.I. 1993/2107)
- Social Security (Claims and Payments) Amendment (No. 3) Regulations 1993 (S.I. 1993/2113)
- Airports (Designation) (Removal and Disposal of Vehicles) (Amendment) Order 1993 (S.I. 1993/2117)
- Housing Benefit and Council Tax Benefit (Miscellaneous Amendments) Regulations 1993 (S.I. 1993/2118)
- Income-related Benefits Schemes (Miscellaneous Amendments) (No. 4) Regulations 1993 (S.I. 1993/2119)
- Goods Vehicles (Operators' Licences) (Temporary Use in Great Britain) (Amendment) (No. 2) Regulations 1993 (S.I. 1993/2120)
- Air Navigation (Restriction of Flying) (High Security Prisons) (Amendment No. 3) Regulations 1993 (S.I. 1993/2123)
- Winchester–Preston Trunk Road (A34) (Newbury Bypass Detrunking) (No.2) Order 1993 (S.I. 1993/2128)
- Winchester–Preston Trunk Road (A34) (Newbury Bypass) Slip Roads (No.3) Order 1993 (S.I. 1993/2129)
- East Worcester and Severn Trent Water (Amendment of Local Enactments etc.) Order 1993 (S.I. 1993/2130)
- County Court Appeals (Amendment) Order 1993 (S.I. 1993/2131)
- Courts and Legal Services Act 1990 (Commencement No. 9) Order 1993 (S.I. 1993/2132)
- Rules of the Supreme Court (Amendment) 1993 (S.I. 1993/2133)
- Leasehold Reform, Housing and Urban Development Act 1993 (Commencement and Transitional Provisions No. 1) Order 1993 (S.I. 1993/2134)
- Edinburgh Assay Office (Amendment) Order 1993 (S.I. 1993/2135)
- County Court (Amendment No. 2) Rules 1993 (S.I. 1993/2150)
- Combined Probation Areas (Hertfordshire) Order 1993 (S.I. 1993/2151)
- Manchester, Liverpool Road (Castlefield Properties Limited) Light Railway Order 1993 (S.I. 1993/2153)
- East Kent Light Railway Order 1993 (S.I. 1993/2154)
- Mental Health (Nurses) Amendment Order 1993 (S.I. 1993/2155)
- Mental Health (Hospital, Guardianship and Consent to Treatment) Amendment Regulations 1993 (S.I. 1993/2156)
- Leasehold Reform, Housing and Urban Development Act 1993 (Commencement No. 2) (Scotland) Order 1993 (S.I. 1993/2163)
- Housing (Preservation of Right to Buy) (Scotland) Regulations 1993 (S.I. 1993/2164)
- Employment Protection (Continuity of Employment) Regulations 1993 (S.I. 1993/2165)
- Controlled Drugs (Substances Useful for Manufacture) (Intra–Community Trade) Regulations 1993 (S.I. 1993/2166)
- Tobacco Products (Amendment) Regulations 1993 (S.I. 1993/2167)
- A45/A452 Trunk Roads (Stonebridge Grade Separation) Order 1993 (S.I. 1993/2168)
- Education (Further Education Institutions Information) (Wales) Regulations 1993 (S.I. 1993/2169)
- A45 Trunk Road (Middle Bickenhill to Stonebridge) (De-Trunking) Order 1993 (S.I. 1993/2170)
- Liverpool Housing Action Trust (Transfer of Property) Order 1993 (S.I. 1993/2171)
- Public Telecommunication System Designation (Bradford Cable Communications Limited) Order 1993 (S.I. 1993/2172)
- Register of County Court Judgments (Amendment No. 2) Regulations 1993 (S.I. 1993/2173)
- County Court (Forms) (Amendment No. 2) Rules 1993 (S.I. 1993/2174)
- County Court (Amendment No. 3) Rules 1993 (S.I. 1993/2175)
- St. Ives Harbour Revision Order 1993 (S.I. 1993/2176)
- Right to Purchase (Loan Application) (Scotland) Amendment Order 1993 (S.I. 1993/2181)
- Right to Purchase (Application Form) (Scotland) Order 1993 (S.I. 1993/2182)
- Education (National Curriculum) (Assessment Arrangements for English, Welsh, Mathematics and Science) (Key Stage 1) (Wales) Order 1993 (S.I. 1993/2190)
- Education (National Curriculum) (Assessment Arrangements for English, Welsh, Mathematics and Science) (Key Stage 3) (Wales) Order 1993 (S.I. 1993/2191)
- Eastwood and East Kilbride Districts (Busby) Boundaries Amendment (No.2) Order 1993 (S.I. 1993/2192)
- Education (School Performance Information) (Wales) Regulations 1993 (S.I. 1993/2194)
- National Curriculum Council and School Examinations and Assessment Council (Transfer of Property) Order 1993 (S.I. 1993/2195)
- Motor Vehicles (EC Type Approval) (Amendment) (No. 2) Regulations 1993 (S.I. 1993/2198)
- Road Vehicles (Construction and Use) (Amendment) (No. 2) Regulations 1993 (S.I. 1993/2199)

==== 2200–2299 ====
- Motor Vehicles (Type Approval for Goods Vehicles) (Great Britain) (Amendment) Regulations 1993 (S.I. 1993/2200)
- Motor Vehicles (Type Approval) (Great Britain) (Amendment) Regulations 1993 (S.I. 1993/2201)
- Bananas (Interim Measures) (Revocation) Regulations 1993 (S.I. 1993/2204)
- Wireless Telegraphy (Television Licence Fees) (Amendment) (No. 2) Regulations 1993 (S.I. 1993/2205)
- National Health Service (General Dental Services) Amendment Regulations 1993 (S.I. 1993/2209)
- Dental Vocational Training Authority Regulations 1993 (S.I. 1993/2210)
- Dental Vocational Training Authority (Establishment and Constitution) and Appeal Body (Specification) Order 1993 (S.I. 1993/2211)
- Taxes (Interest Rate) (Amendment No. 3) Regulations 1993 (S.I. 1993/2212)
- Friendly Societies Act 1992 (Commencement No. 6 and Transitional Provisions) Order 1993 (S.I. 1993/2213)
- Finance Act 1993 (Appointed Day) Order 1993 (S.I. 1993/2214)
- Finance Act 1993, section 12, (Appointed Day) Order 1993 (S.I. 1993/2215)
- National Health Service (District Health Authorities) (No.2) Order 1993 (S.I. 1993/2218)
- National Health Service (Determination of Districts) (No.2) Order 1993 (S.I. 1993/2219)
- National Health Service (General Dental Services) (Scotland) Amendment Regulations 1993 (S.I. 1993/2224)
- Parole Board (Scotland) Rules 1993 (S.I. 1993/2225)
- Transcripts of Criminal Proceedings (Scotland) Order 1993 (S.I. 1993/2226)
- Prison (Scotland) Amendment Rules 1993 (S.I. 1993/2227)
- Young Offenders (Scotland) Amendment Rules 1993 (S.I. 1993/2228)
- Road Traffic Act 1991 (Commencement No. 7 and Transitional Provisions) Order 1993 (S.I. 1993/2229)
- National Assistance (Assessment of Resources) (Amendment No.2) Regulations 1993 (S.I. 1993/2230)
- National Curriculum Council and School Examinations and Assessment Council (Designation of Staff) Order 1993 (S.I. 1993/2231)
- Export of Goods (Control) (Haiti) (Revocation) Order 1993 (S.I. 1993/2232)
- Motor Vehicles (Competitions and Trials) (Amendment) Regulations 1993 (S.I. 1993/2233)
- Road Traffic (Special Parking Areas) (London Boroughs of Bromley, Hammersmith and Fulham and Lewisham) (London Borough of Wandsworth) (Amendment) Order 1993 (S.I. 1993/2237)
- Housing (Extension of Right to Buy) Order 1993 (S.I. 1993/2240)
- Housing (Preservation of Right to Buy) Regulations 1993 (S.I. 1993/2241)
- Valuation Timetable (Scotland) Amendment (No.3) Order 1993 (S.I. 1993/2242)
- Housing (Right to Buy Delay Procedure) (Prescribed Forms) (Amendment) Regulations 1993 (S.I. 1993/2245)
- Housing (Right to Buy) (Prescribed Forms) (Amendment) Regulations 1993 (S.I. 1993/2246)
- Law Reform (Miscellaneous Provisions) (Scotland) Act 1990 (Commencement No.12) Order 1993 (S.I. 1993/2253)
- Public Trusts (Reorganisation) (Scotland) (No.2) Regulations 1993 (S.I. 1993/2254)
- Fish Health (Amendment) Regulations 1993 (S.I. 1993/2255)
- Royal National Hospital for Rheumatic Diseases National Health Service Trust (Transfer of Trust Property) Order 1993 (S.I. 1993/2256)
- St Peter's Hospital National Health Service Trust (Transfer of Trust Property) Order 1993 (S.I. 1993/2257)
- Bath Mental Health Care National Health Service Trust (Transfer of Trust Property) Order 1993 (S.I. 1993/2258)
- Wiltshire Health Care National Health Service Trust (Transfer of Trust Property) Order 1993 (S.I. 1993/2259)
- North Mersey Community National Health Service Trust (Transfer of Trust Property) Order 1993 (S.I. 1993/2260)
- Bath and West Community National Health Service Trust (Transfer of Trust Property) Order 1993 (S.I. 1993/2261)
- Royal United Hospital, Bath, National Health Service Trust (Transfer of Trust Property) Order 1993 (S.I. 1993/2262)
- Weybourne Community National Health Service Trust (Transfer of Trust Property) Order 1993 (S.I. 1993/2263)
- King's Lynn and Wisbech Hospitals National Health Service Trust (Transfer of Trust Property) Order 1993 (S.I. 1993/2264)
- Hydrocarbon Oil (Amendment) Regulations 1993 (S.I. 1993/2267)
- Local Government Act 1988 (Defined Activities) (Exemption) (Horsham District Council and Worthing Borough Council) Order 1993 (S.I. 1993/2269)
- Finance (No. 2) Act 1992 (Commencement No. 6 and Transitional Provisions and Savings) Order 1993 (S.I. 1993/2272)
- Income Tax (Employments) (Amendment) Regulations 1993 (S.I. 1993/2276)
- Smoke Control Areas (Exempted Fireplaces) Order 1993 (S.I. 1993/2277)
- Sea Fish Licensing (Variation) (No. 2) Order 1993 (S.I. 1993/2291)
- Friendly Societies (Proxy Voting) Regulations 1993 (S.I. 1993/2294)
- Commissioners for Oaths (Fees) Order 1993 (S.I. 1993/2297)
- Commissioners for Oaths (Authorised Persons) (Fees) Order 1993 (S.I. 1993/2298)
- Food Protection (Emergency Prohibitions) (Paralytic Shellfish Poisoning) Orders 1993 Revocation Order 1993 (S.I. 1993/2299)

==== 2300–2399 ====
- Sandwell Borough Council (Patent Shaft/Moorcroft Infrastructure) (Walsall Canal Bridge) Scheme 1993 Confirmation Instrument 1993 (S.I. 1993/2302)
- Civil Aviation (Canadian Navigation Services) (Fourth Amendment) Regulations 1993 (S.I. 1993/2320)
- Highlands and Islands Rural Enterprise Programme (Revocation) Regulations 1993 (S.I. 1993/2325)
- Value Added Tax (Reverse Charge) Order 1993 (S.I. 1993/2328)
- Telecommunications (Leased Lines) Regulations 1993 (S.I. 1993/2330)
- Coal Mines (Owner's Operating Rules) Regulations 1993 (S.I. 1993/2331)
- Combined Probation Areas (East Sussex) Order 1993 (S.I. 1993/2332)
- Plant Health Fees (Scotland) Amendment Order 1993 (S.I. 1993/2344)
- Environmentally Sensitive Areas (Cairngorms Straths) Designation Order 1993 (S.I. 1993/2345)
- Act of Sederunt (Enforcement of Judgments under the Civil Jurisdiction and Judgments Act 1982) (Authentic Instruments and Court Settlements) 1993 (S.I. 1993/2346)
- Haydon Natural Gas Pipe–lines Order 1993 (S.I. 1993/2347)
- Croydon, Merton and Sutton (London Borough Boundaries) Order 1993 (S.I. 1993/2350)
- Angola (United Nations Sanctions) Order 1993 (S.I. 1993/2355)
- Angola (United Nations Sanctions) (Dependent Territories) Order 1993 (S.I. 1993/2356)
- Angola (United Nations Sanctions) (Channel Islands) Order 1993 (S.I. 1993/2357)
- Angola (United Nations Sanctions) (Isle of Man) Order 1993 (S.I. 1993/2358)
- Exempt Charities Order 1993 (S.I. 1993/2359)
- Clinical Thermometers (EEC Requirements) Regulations 1993 (S.I. 1993/2360)
- Ionising Radiations (Outside Workers) Regulations 1993 (S.I. 1993/2379)
- Assured and Protected Tenancies (Lettings to Students) (Amendment) Regulations 1993 (S.I. 1993/2390)
- Act of Adjournal (Consolidation Amendment No.2) (Miscellaneous) 1993 (S.I. 1993/2391)
- Medicines (Veterinary Medicinal Products) (Applications for Product Licences) Regulations 1993 (S.I. 1993/2398)
- Medicines (Veterinary Medicinal Products) (Renewal Applications for Product Licences Subject to Review) Regulations 1993 (S.I. 1993/2399)

==== 2400–2499 ====
- County Council of Clwyd (River Dee Estuary Bridge) Scheme 1992 Confirmation Instrument 1993 (S.I. 1993/2400)
- Environmental Protection (Prescribed Processes and Substances) (Amendment) (No. 2) Regulations 1993 (S.I. 1993/2405)
- Offshore Safety Act 1992 (Commencement No. 1) Order 1993 (S.I. 1993/2406)
- Leasehold Reform (Collective Enfranchisement and Lease Renewal) Regulations 1993 (S.I. 1993/2407)
- Rent Assessment Committee (England and Wales) (Leasehold Valuation Tribunal) Regulations 1993 (S.I. 1993/2408)
- Leasehold Reform (Notices) (Amendment) Regulations 1993 (S.I. 1993/2409)
- Local Government and Housing Act 1989 (Commencement No. 16) Order 1993 (S.I. 1993/2410)
- National Health Service (General Medical Services) Amendment (No. 2) Regulations 1993 (S.I. 1993/2421)
- Environmentally Sensitive Areas (Ynys Mo*n) Designation (Amendment) Order 1993 (S.I. 1993/2422)
- Patents (Amendment) Rules 1993 (S.I. 1993/2423)
- Pembrokeshire National Health Service Trust (Transfer of Trust Property) Order 1993 (S.I. 1993/2436)
- Strathclyde Region (Electoral Arrangements) Order 1993 (S.I. 1993/2439)
- Finance Act 1993, Section 18, (Appointed Day) Order 1993 (S.I. 1993/2446)
- National Health Service (General Medical and Pharmaceutical Services) (Scotland) Amendment (No. 2) Regulations 1993 (S.I. 1993/2449)
- Social Fund Cold Weather Payments (General) Amendment Regulations 1993 (S.I. 1993/2450)
- National Health Service (Pharmaceutical Services) Amendment Regulations 1993 (S.I. 1993/2451)
- Vehicles Excise Duty (Simplification of Goods Vehicles Rates) Order 1993 (S.I. 1993/2452)
- Restrictive Trade Practices (Standards and Arrangements) (Services) Order 1993 (S.I. 1993/2453)
- Sole (Specified Sea Areas) (Prohibition of Fishing) Order 1993 (S.I. 1993/2459)
- East Gloucestershire National Health Service Trust (Transfer of Trust Property) Order 1993 (S.I. 1993/2460)
- Mulberry National Health Service Trust (Transfer of Trust Property) Order 1993 (S.I. 1993/2461)
- Southampton Community Health Services National Health Service Trust (Transfer of Trust Property) Order 1993 (S.I. 1993/2462)
- London South Circular Trunk Road (A205)(London Road, Lewisham and Southwark) (Box Junction) Order 1993 (S.I. 1993/2463)
- London South Circular Trunk Road (A205) (Lordship Lane, Lewisham and Southwark) (Box Junction) Order 1993 (S.I. 1993/2464)
- Sole (Specified Sea Areas) (Prohibition of Fishing) (No. 2) Order 1993 (S.I. 1993/2465)
- Restrictive Trade Practices (Standards and Arrangements) (Goods) Order 1993 (S.I. 1993/2473)
- Road Traffic Accidents (Payments for Treatment) Order 1993 (S.I. 1993/2474)
- Income Tax (Interest Relief) (Qualifying Lenders) (No. 3) Order 1993 (S.I. 1993/2478)
- Offshore Installations (Safety Zones) (No. 4) Order 1993 (S.I. 1993/2479)
- Miscellaneous Factories (Transitional Provisions) Regulations 1993 (S.I. 1993/2482)
- Design Right (Semiconductor Topographies) (Amendment) Regulations 1993 (S.I. 1993/2497)
- Value Added Tax (Beverages) Order 1993 (S.I. 1993/2498)
- Smoke Control Areas (Authorised Fuels) (Amendment) Regulations 1993 (S.I. 1993/2499)

=== 2500-2999 ===
==== 2500–2599 ====
- Trade Union Reform and Employment Rights Act 1993 (Commencement No. 2 and Transitional Provisions) Order 1993 (S.I. 1993/2503)
- Combined Probation Areas (Dorset) Order 1993 (S.I. 1993/2512)
- Teachers' (Superannuation and Compensation for Premature Retirement) (Scotland) Amendment Regulations 1993 (S.I. 1993/2513)
- Coal Industry Act 1992 (Commencement) Order 1993 (S.I. 1993/2514)
- Export of Goods (Control) (Amendment No. 5) Order 1993 (S.I. 1993/2515)
- Friendly Societies (Qualifications of Actuaries No.2) Regulations 1993 (S.I. 1993/2518)
- Friendly Societies (Amendment) Regulations 1993 (S.I. 1993/2519)
- Friendly Societies (Insurance Business No. 2) Regulations 1993 (S.I. 1993/2520)
- Friendly Societies (Authorisation No. 2) Regulations 1993 (S.I. 1993/2521)
- A11 Trunk Road (Roudham Heath to Attleborough Improvement and Slip Roads) Order 1993 (S.I. 1993/2524)
- A11 Trunk Road (Roudham Heath to Attleborough Improvement) (Detrunking) Order 1993 (S.I. 1993/2525)
- Protection of Wrecks (Designation No. 2) Order 1993 (S.I. 1993/2526)
- Police (Amendment) (No. 4) Regulations 1993 (S.I. 1993/2527)
- Police Cadets (Amendment) Regulations 1993 (S.I. 1993/2528)
- Fodder Plant Seeds (Amendment) Regulations 1993 (S.I. 1993/2529)
- Seeds (Registration, Licensing and Enforcement) (Amendment) Regulations 1993 (S.I. 1993/2530)
- Local Government Superannuation (Maternity Absence) Regulations 1993 (S.I. 1993/2531)
- Sea Fisheries Districts (Variation) Order 1993 (S.I. 1993/2532)
- Suppression of Terrorism Act 1978 (Application of Provisions) (India) Order 1993 (S.I. 1993/2533)
- Medicines (Applications for Grant of Product Licences—Products for Human Use) Regulations 1993 (S.I. 1993/2538)
- Medicines (Standard Provisions for Licences and Certificates) Amendment (No. 2) Regulations 1993 (S.I. 1993/2539)
- Birmingham Women's Health Care National Health Service Trust (Establishment) Order 1993 (S.I. 1993/2541)
- Northern Birmingham Community Health National Health Service Trust (Establishment) Order 1993 (S.I. 1993/2542)
- South Birmingham Community Health National Health Service Trust (Establishment) Order 1993 (S.I. 1993/2543)
- Churchill John Radcliffe National Health Service Trust (Establishment) Order 1993 (S.I. 1993/2544)
- City Hospital National Health Service Trust (Establishment) Order 1993 (S.I. 1993/2545)
- Derbyshire Ambulance Service National Health Service Trust (Establishment) Order 1993 (S.I. 1993/2546)
- Derbyshire Royal Infirmary National Health Service Trust (Establishment) Order 1993 (S.I. 1993/2547)
- Dewsbury Health Care National Health Service Trust (Establishment) Order 1993 (S.I. 1993/2548)
- East Wiltshire Health Care National Health Service Trust (Establishment) Order 1993 (S.I. 1993/2549)
- East Yorkshire Community Healthcare National Health Service Trust (Establishment) Order 1993 (S.I. 1993/2550)
- George Eliot Hospital National Health Service Trust (Establishment) Order 1993 (S.I. 1993/2551)
- Hereford Hospitals National Health Service Trust (Establishment) Order 1993 (S.I. 1993/2552)
- Hereford and Worcester Ambulance Service National Health Service Trust (Establishment) Order 1993 (S.I. 1993/2553)
- Hull and Holderness Community Health National Health Service Trust (Establishment) Order 1993 (S.I. 1993/2554)
- Kent Ambulance National Health Service Trust (Establishment) Order 1993 (S.I. 1993/2555)
- Kettering General Hospital National Health Service Trust (Establishment) Order 1993 (S.I. 1993/2556)
- King's Mill Centre for Health Care Services National Health Service Trust (Establishment) Order 1993 (S.I. 1993/2557)
- Leicestershire Ambulance and Paramedic Service National Health Service Trust (Establishment) Order 1993 (S.I. 1993/2558)
- Leicestershire Mental Health Service National Health Service Trust (Establishment) Order 1993 (S.I. 1993/2559)
- Lincoln Hospitals National Health Service Trust (Establishment) Order 1993 (S.I. 1993/2560)
- Northampton General Hospital National Health Service Trust (Establishment) Order 1993 (S.I. 1993/2561)
- Norwich Community Health Partnership National Health Service Trust (Establishment) Order 1993 (S.I. 1993/2562)
- Nottingham Healthcare National Health Service Trust (Establishment) Order 1993 (S.I. 1993/2563)
- Oxfordshire Ambulance National Health Service Trust (Establishment) Order 1993 (S.I. 1993/2564)
- Oxfordshire Community Health National Health Service Trust (Establishment) Order 1993 (S.I. 1993/2565)
- Oxfordshire Mental Healthcare National Health Service Trust (Establishment) Order 1993 (S.I. 1993/2566)
- Pilgrim Health National Health Service Trust (Establishment) Order 1993 (S.I. 1993/2567)
- Plymouth Hospitals National Health Service Trust (Establishment) Order 1993 (S.I. 1993/2568)
- Portsmouth Health Care National Health Service Trust (Establishment) Order 1993 (S.I. 1993/2569)
- Riverside Community Health Care National Health Service Trust (Establishment) Order 1993 (S.I. 1993/2570)
- Robert Jones and Agnes Hunt Orthopaedic and District Hospital National Health Service Trust (Establishment) Order 1993 (S.I. 1993/2571)
- Rockingham Forest National Health Service Trust (Establishment) Order 1993 (S.I. 1993/2572)
- Royal Shrewsbury Hospitals National Health Service Trust (Establishment) Order 1993 (S.I. 1993/2573)
- Royal Wolverhampton Hospitals National Health Service Trust (Establishment) Order 1993 (S.I. 1993/2574)
- Salisbury Health Care National Health Service Trust (Establishment) Order 1993 (S.I. 1993/2575)
- Solihull Healthcare National Health Service Trust (Establishment) Order 1993 (S.I. 1993/2576)
- Stoke Mandeville Hospital National Health Service Trust (Establishment) Order 1993 (S.I. 1993/2577)
- Wandsworth Community Health National Health Service Trust (Establishment) Order 1993 (S.I. 1993/2578)
- Warwickshire Ambulance Service National Health Service Trust (Establishment) Order 1993 (S.I. 1993/2579)
- South Warwickshire Mental Health National Health Service Trust (Establishment) Order 1993 (S.I. 1993/2580)
- Winchester and Eastleigh Healthcare National Health Service Trust (Establishment) Order 1993 (S.I. 1993/2581)
- Worcester Royal Infirmary National Health Service Trust (Establishment) Order 1993 (S.I. 1993/2582)
- Chichester Priority Care Services National Health Service Trust (Establishment) Order 1993 (S.I. 1993/2589)
- Mental Health Services of Salford National Health Service Trust (Establishment) Order 1993 (S.I. 1993/2590)
- Hartlepool Community Care National Health Service Trust (Establishment) Order 1993 (S.I. 1993/2591)
- Blackburn, Hyndburn and Ribble Valley Health Care National Health Service Trust (Establishment) Order 1993 (S.I. 1993/2592)
- Northumberland Community Health National Health Service Trust (Establishment) Order 1993 (S.I. 1993/2593)
- North Manchester Healthcare National Health Service Trust (Establishment) Order 1993 (S.I. 1993/2594)
- Community Healthcare Bolton National Health Service Trust (Establishment) Order 1993 (S.I. 1993/2595)
- CommuniCare National Health Service Trust (Establishment) Order 1993 (S.I. 1993/2596)
- Blackpool, Wyre and Fylde Community Health Services National Health Service Trust (Establishment) Order 1993 (S.I. 1993/2597)
- Blackpool Victoria Hospital National Health Service Trust (Establishment) Order 1993 (S.I. 1993/2598)
- Bury Health Care National Health Service Trust (Establishment) Order 1993 (S.I. 1993/2599)

==== 2600–2699 ====
- Greater Manchester Ambulance Service National Health Service Trust (Establishment) Order 1993 (S.I. 1993/2600)
- Lancashire Ambulance Service National Health Service Trust (Establishment) Order 1993 (S.I. 1993/2601)
- Tameside and Glossop Acute Services National Health Service Trust (Establishment) Order 1993 (S.I. 1993/2602)
- Darlington Memorial Hospital National Health Service Trust (Establishment) Order 1993 (S.I. 1993/2603)
- Bolton Hospitals National Health Service Trust (Establishment) Order 1993 (S.I. 1993/2604)
- Priority Healthcare Wearside National Health Service Trust (Establishment) Order 1993 (S.I. 1993/2605)
- Community Health Care Service (North Derbyshire) National Health Service Trust (Establishment) Order 1993 (S.I. 1993/2606)
- Wirral Community Healthcare National Health Service Trust (Establishment) Order 1993 (S.I. 1993/2607)
- North Lakeland Healthcare National Health Service Trust (Establishment) Order 1993 (S.I. 1993/2608)
- North Downs Community Health National Health Service Trust (Establishment) Order 1993 (S.I. 1993/2609)
- South Durham Health Care National Health Service Trust (Establishment) Order 1993 (S.I. 1993/2610)
- Salford Community Health Care National Health Service Trust (Establishment) Order 1993 (S.I. 1993/2611)
- Community Health Care: North Durham National Health Service Trust (Establishment) Order 1993 (S.I. 1993/2612)
- Kingston and District Community National Health Service Trust (Establishment) Order 1993 (S.I. 1993/2613)
- North Durham Acute Hospitals National Health Service Trust (Establishment) Order 1993 (S.I. 1993/2614)
- Northampton Community Healthcare National Health Service Trust (Establishment) Order 1993 (S.I. 1993/2615)
- Bishop Auckland Hospitals National Health Service Trust (Establishment) Order 1993 (S.I. 1993/2616)
- Carlisle Hospitals National Health Service Trust (Establishment) Order 1993 (S.I. 1993/2617)
- Cheviot and Wansbeck National Health Service Trust (Establishment) Order 1993 (S.I. 1993/2618)
- City Hospitals Sunderland National Health Service Trust (Establishment) Order 1993 (S.I. 1993/2619)
- West Cheshire National Health Service Trust (Establishment) Order 1993 (S.I. 1993/2620)
- South Kent Community Healthcare National Health Service Trust (Establishment) Order 1993 (S.I. 1993/2621)
- Stockport Acute Services National Health Service Trust (Establishment) Order 1993 (S.I. 1993/2622)
- Guild Community Healthcare National Health Service Trust (Establishment) Order 1993 (S.I. 1993/2623)
- North Tyneside Health Care National Health Service Trust (Establishment) Order 1993 (S.I. 1993/2624)
- Preston Acute Hospitals National Health Service Trust (Establishment) Order 1993 (S.I. 1993/2625)
- Tameside and Glossop Community and Priority Services National Health Service Trust (Establishment) Order 1993 (S.I. 1993/2626)
- Hartlepool and Peterlee Hospitals National Health Service Trust (Establishment) Order 1993 (S.I. 1993/2627)
- Stockport Healthcare National Health Service Trust (Establishment) Order 1993 (S.I. 1993/2628)
- New Possibilities National Health Service Trust (Establishment) Order 1993 (S.I. 1993/2629)
- Shropshire's Community Health Service National Health Service Trust (Establishment) Order 1993 (S.I. 1993/2630)
- Hill Livestock (Compensatory Allowances) Regulations 1993 (S.I. 1993/2631)
- National Lottery etc. Act 1993 (Commencement No. 1 and Transitional Provisions) Order 1993 (S.I. 1993/2632)
- South East London Mental Health National Health Service Trust (Establishment) Order 1993 (S.I. 1993/2633)
- Haringey Health Care National Health Service Trust (Establishment) Order 1993 (S.I. 1993/2634)
- North Staffordshire Combined Healthcare National Health Service Trust (Establishment) Order 1993 (S.I. 1993/2635)
- Lincoln District Healthcare National Health Service Trust (Establishment) Order 1993 (S.I. 1993/2636)
- Swindon and Marlborough National Health Service Trust (Establishment) Order 1993 (S.I. 1993/2637)
- Louth and District Healthcare National Health Service Trust (Establishment) Order 1993 (S.I. 1993/2638)
- North Kent Healthcare National Health Service Trust (Establishment) Order 1993 (S.I. 1993/2639)
- Medway National Health Service Trust (Establishment) Order 1993 (S.I. 1993/2640)
- Queen Victoria Hospital National Health Service Trust (Establishment) Order 1993 (S.I. 1993/2641)
- Dartford and Gravesham National Health Service Trust (Establishment) Order 1993 (S.I. 1993/2642)
- Worthing and Southlands Hospitals National Health Service Trust (Establishment) Order 1993 (S.I. 1993/2643)
- Gipsy Encampments (Borough of Holderness) Order 1993 (S.I. 1993/2644)
- Norfolk Mental Health Care National Health Service Trust (Establishment) Order 1993 (S.I. 1993/2657)
- Private Legislation Procedure (Scotland) General Order 1993 (S.I. 1993/2660)
- European Communities (Designation) (No. 3) Order 1993 (S.I. 1993/2661)
- Birmingham City Council (Grand Union Canal Bridge) Scheme 1991 Confirmation Instrument 1993 (S.I. 1993/2662)
- European Convention on Extradition (Fiscal Offences) Order 1993 (S.I. 1993/2663)
- Admiralty Jurisdiction (Guernsey) Order 1993 (S.I. 1993/2664)
- Agriculture (Northern Ireland) Order 1993 (S.I. 1993/2665)
- Arms Control and Disarmament (Privileges and Immunities) Act 1988 (Guernsey) Order 1993 (S.I. 1993/2666)
- European Convention on Extradition (Hungary and Poland) (Amendment) Order 1993 (S.I. 1993/2667)
- Industrial Relations (Northern Ireland) Order 1993 (S.I. 1993/2668)
- Treaty on Open Skies (Privileges and Immunities) (Guernsey) Order 1993 (S.I. 1993/2669)
- Air Navigation (Fifth Amendment) Order 1993 (S.I. 1993/2670)
- Birmingham Heartlands Hospital National Health Service Trust (Transfer of Trust Property) Order 1993 (S.I. 1993/2680)
- Croydon Community National Health Service Trust (Transfer of Trust Property) Order 1993 (S.I. 1993/2681)
- Herefordshire Community Health National Health Service Trust (Transfer of Trust Property) Order 1993 (S.I. 1993/2682)
- Princess Royal Hospital National Health Service Trust (Transfer of Trust Property) Order 1993 (S.I. 1993/2683)
- Ravensbourne Priority Health National Health Service Trust (Transfer of Trust Property) Order 1993 (S.I. 1993/2684)
- St. Helier National Health Service Trust (Transfer of Trust Property) Order 1993 (S.I. 1993/2685)
- Walsgrave Hospitals National Health Service Trust (Transfer of Trust Property) Order 1993 (S.I. 1993/2686)
- Industrial Tribunals (Constitution and Rules of Procedure) Regulations 1993 (S.I. 1993/2687)
- Industrial Tribunals (Constitution and Rules of Procedure) (Scotland) Regulations 1993 (S.I. 1993/2688)
- Disclosure of Interests in Shares (Amendment) (No. 2) Regulations 1993 (S.I. 1993/2689)
- Prior Rights of Surviving Spouse (Scotland) S.I. 1993/2690)
- Central Manchester National Health Service Trust (Transfer of Trust Property) Order 1993 (S.I. 1993/2691)
- Lancaster Acute Hospitals National Health Service Trust (Transfer of Trust Property) Order 1993 (S.I. 1993/2692)
- Lancaster Priority Services National Health Service Trust (Transfer of Trust Property) Order 1993 (S.I. 1993/2693)
- Lifecare National Health Service Trust (Transfer of Trust Property) Order 1993 (S.I. 1993/2694)
- Lifespan Health Care Cambridge National Health Service Trust (Transfer of Trust Property) Order 1993 (S.I. 1993/2695)
- Lincolnshire Ambulance and Health Transport Service National Health Service Trust (Transfer of Trust Property) Order 1993 (S.I. 1993/2696)
- Mayday Healthcare National Health Service Trust (Transfer of Trust Property) Order 1993 (S.I. 1993/2697)
- Weights and Measures Act 1985 Commencement (Revocation) Order 1993 (S.I. 1993/2698)

==== 2700–2799 ====
- Social Security (Introduction of Disability Living Allowance) (Amendment) (No. 3) Regulations 1993 (S.I. 1993/2704)
- Capital Allowances (Corresponding Northern Ireland Grants) Order 1993 (S.I. 1993/2705)
- Building Societies (Designation of Qualifying Bodies) (No. 3) Order 1993 (S.I. 1993/2706)
- Education (No. 2) Act 1986 (Amendment) Order 1993 (S.I. 1993/2709)
- Housing Renovation etc. Grants (Grant Limit) (Amendment) Order 1993 (S.I. 1993/2711)
- Reconstitution of the River Ouzel Internal Drainage Board Order 1993 (S.I. 1993/2712)
- Placing on the Market and Supervision of Transfers of Explosives Regulations 1993 (S.I. 1993/2714)
- Food Labelling (Scotland) Amendment Regulations 1993 (S.I. 1993/2731)
- Teachers (Education, Training and Recommendation for Registration) (Scotland) Regulations 1993 (S.I. 1993/2732)
- Portsmouth Mile End Quay (Berth No. 2 Extension) Harbour Revision Order 1993 (S.I. 1993/2733)
- Criminal Justice Act 1993 (Commencement No. 3) Order 1993 (S.I. 1993/2734)
- Social Security (Contributions) (Miscellaneous Amendments) Regulations 1993 (S.I. 1993/2736)
- Public Service Vehicles (Registration of Local Services) (Amendment) Regulations 1993 (S.I. 1993/2752)
- Public Service Vehicles (Operators' Licences) (Amendment) Regulations 1993 (S.I. 1993/2753)
- Public Service Vehicles (Traffic Commissioners: Publication and Inquiries) (Amendment) Regulations 1993 (S.I. 1993/2754)
- Copyright (Certification of Licensing Scheme for Educational Recording of Broadcasts) (Open University Educational Enterprises Limited) Order 1993 (S.I. 1993/2755)
- Housing (Right to Buy) (Priority of Charges) (No. 2) Order 1993 (S.I. 1993/2757)
- Mortgage Indemnities (Recognised Bodies) (No.2) Order 1993 (S.I. 1993/2758)
- Food Labelling (Amendment) Regulations 1993 (S.I. 1993/2759)
- Rules of the Supreme Court (Amendment No. 2) 1993 (S.I. 1993/2760)
- Northern Ireland (Emergency Provisions) Act 1991 (Codes of Practice) (No. 1) Order 1993 (S.I. 1993/2761)
- Leasehold Reform, Housing and Urban Development Act 1993 (Commencement and Transitional Provisions No. 3) Order 1993 (S.I. 1993/2762)
- Environmentally Sensitive Areas (Central Borders) Designation Order 1993 (S.I. 1993/2767)
- Environmentally Sensitive Areas (Stewartry) Designation Order 1993 (S.I. 1993/2768)
- Charities (Designated Religious Bodies) (Scotland) Order 1993 (S.I. 1993/2774)
- Plant Breeders' Rights (Amendment) Regulations 1993 (S.I. 1993/2775)
- Plant Breeders' Rights (Trees, Shrubs and Woody Climbers) Scheme 1993 (S.I. 1993/2776)
- Plant Breeders' Rights (Tomatoes) Scheme 1993 (S.I. 1993/2777)
- Plant Breeders' Rights (Miscellaneous Ornamental Plants) (Variation) Scheme 1993 (S.I. 1993/2778)
- Plant Breeders' Rights (Sainfoin and Birdsfoot Trefoil) Scheme 1993 (S.I. 1993/2779)
- Plant Breeders' Rights (Herbaceous Perennials) (Variation) Scheme 1993 (S.I. 1993/2780)
- Plant Breeders' Rights (Quince Rootstocks) Scheme 1993 (S.I. 1993/2781)
- Finance Act 1993 (Appointed Day No. 2) Order 1993 (S.I. 1993/2782)
- Local Government Superannuation (South Yorkshire Transport Limited) Regulations 1993 (S.I. 1993/2783)
- Northern Ireland (Emergency Provisions) Act 1991 (Codes of Practice) (No. 2) Order 1993 (S.I. 1993/2788)
- County Court Appeals (Amendment) (Transitional Provisions) Order 1993 (S.I. 1993/2789)
- Transport Act 1985 (Modifications in Schedule 4 to the Transport Act 1968) (Further Modification) Order 1993 (S.I. 1993/2797)
- Sex Discrimination and Equal Pay (Remedies) Regulations 1993 (S.I. 1993/2798)
- Home Energy Efficiency Grants (Amendment) Regulations 1993 (S.I. 1993/2799)

==== 2800–2899 ====
- Scottish Electricity Boards (Dissolution) Order 1993 (S.I. 1993/2802)
- Road Traffic Act 1991 (Commencement No. 8 and Transitional Provisions) Order 1993 (S.I. 1993/2803)
- Road Traffic (Special Parking Areas) (London Boroughs of Camden, Hackney and Hounslow) Order 1993 (S.I. 1993/2804)
- Meldon Quarry Branch Line Order 1993 (S.I. 1993/2805)
- Foreign Compensation (Financial Provisions) (No. 2) Order 1993 (S.I. 1993/2806)
- Libya (United Nations Sanctions) Order 1993 (S.I. 1993/2807)
- Libya (United Nations Sanctions) (Dependent Territories) Order 1993 (S.I. 1993/2808)
- State Immunity (Federal States) Order 1993 (S.I. 1993/2809)
- Education and Libraries (Northern Ireland) Order 1993 (S.I. 1993/2810)
- Libya (United Nations Sanctions) (Channel Islands) Order 1993 (S.I. 1993/2811)
- Libya (United Nations Sanctions) (Isle of Man) Order 1993 (S.I. 1993/2812)
- Local Government Act 1988 (Defined Activities) (Exemption) (Wales) Order 1993 (S.I. 1993/2813)
- British Railways (Penalty Fares) Act 1989 (Activating No. 11) Order 1993 (S.I. 1993/2814)
- Central Manchester National Health Service Trust (Change of Name) Order 1993 (S.I. 1993/2815)
- Cleveland Ambulance National Health Service Trust (Establishment) Amendment Order 1993 (S.I. 1993/2816)
- Education (School Information) (Amendment) (England) Regulations 1993 (S.I. 1993/2824)
- Area Boards (Dissolution) Order 1993 (S.I. 1993/2825)
- Collecting Societies (Returns) Regulations 1993 (S.I. 1993/2826)
- Education (No. 2) Act 1986 (Amendment) (No. 2) Order 1993 (S.I. 1993/2827)
- Education (Recognised Awards) (Richmond College) Order 1993 (S.I. 1993/2828)
- Finance Act 1993, section 211, (Appointed Day) Order 1993 (S.I. 1993/2831)
- A61 Trunk Road (Sheffield to Westwood Roundabout) (Detrunking) Order 1993 (S.I. 1993/2832)
- Building Societies (Aggregation) Rules 1993 (S.I. 1993/2833)
- Mid Glamorgan Ambulance National Health Service Trust (Establishment) Order 1993 (S.I. 1993/2834)
- Derwen National Health Service Trust (Establishment) Order 1993 (S.I. 1993/2835)
- North Wales Ambulance National Health Service Trust (Establishment) Order 1993 (S.I. 1993/2836)
- Rhondda Health Care National Health Service Trust (Establishment) Order 1993 (S.I. 1993/2837)
- Velindre National Health Service Trust (Establishment) Order 1993 (S.I. 1993/2838)
- Gwynedd Community Health National Health Service Trust (Establishment) Order 1993 (S.I. 1993/2839)
- Nevill Hall and District National Health Service Trust (Establishment) Order 1993 (S.I. 1993/2840)
- Gwynedd Hospitals National Health Service Trust (Establishment) Order 1993 (S.I. 1993/2841)
- Finance Act 1993, Chapter II, (Appointed Day) Order 1993 (S.I. 1993/2842)
- Payments to Redundant Churches Fund Order 1993 (S.I. 1993/2846)
- Ordination of Women (Financial Provisions) (Appeals) Rules 1993 (S.I. 1993/2847)
- East Anglian Ambulance National Health Service Trust (Establishment) Order 1993 (S.I. 1993/2848)
- Norfolk Ambulance National Health Service Trust Dissolution Order 1993 (S.I. 1993/2849)
- Combined Probation Areas (Cumbria) Order 1993 (S.I. 1993/2852)
- Combined Probation Areas (Greater Manchester) Order 1993 (S.I. 1993/2853)
- Employment Appeal Tribunal Rules 1993 (S.I. 1993/2854)
- Birmingham City Council (Grand Union Canal Bridge) Scheme 1992 Confirmation Instrument 1993 (S.I. 1993/2855)
- Mid Essex Community and Mental Health National Health Service Trust (Establishment) Order 1993 (S.I. 1993/2856)
- Wigan and Leigh Health Services National Health Service Trust (Transfer of Trust Property) Order 1993 (S.I. 1993/2857)
- Public Airport Companies (Capital Finance) (Fourth Amendment) Order 1993 (S.I. 1993/2875)
- Conservation of Seals (England) Order 1993 (S.I. 1993/2876)
- Motor Vehicles Tyres (Safety) (Amendment) Regulations 1993 (S.I. 1993/2877)
- Local Government Reorganisation (Capital Money) (Greater London) (Amendment) Order 1993 (S.I. 1993/2878)
- Redbridge and Waltham Forest (London Borough Boundaries) Order 1993 (S.I. 1993/2881)
- Local Government (Compensation for Premature Retirement) (Amendment) Regulations 1993 (S.I. 1993/2890)
- Local Government Act 1988 (Defined Activities) (Exemption) (Wales) (No. 2) Order 1993 (S.I. 1993/2894)
- Protection of Wrecks (Designation No. 3) Order 1993 (S.I. 1993/2895)
- Community Health Sheffield National Health Service Trust (Establishment) Order 1993 (S.I. 1993/2896)
- Public Telecommunication System Designation (Scottish Power Telecommunications Limited) Order 1993 (S.I. 1993/2897)
- Public Telecommunication System Designation (Torch Communications Limited) Order 1993 (S.I. 1993/2898)
- Public Telecommunication System Designation (MFS Communications Limited) Order 1993 (S.I. 1993/2899)

==== 2900–2999 ====
- Farm and Conservation Grant (Amendment) Regulations 1993 (S.I. 1993/2900)
- Farm and Conservation Grant (Variation) Scheme 1993 (S.I. 1993/2901)
- Medicines (Pharmacies) (Applications for Registration and Fees) Amendment Regulations 1993 (S.I. 1993/2902)
- Motor Vehicles (Type Approval and Approval Marks) (Fees) (Amendment) Regulations 1993 (S.I. 1993/2903)
- Occupational Pensions (Revaluation) Order 1993 (S.I. 1993/2904)
- Family Provision (Intestate Succession) Order 1993 (S.I. 1993/2906)
- Western Isles Islands Council (Brevig) Harbour Empowerment Order 1993 (S.I. 1993/2908)
- Transport Act 1985 (Modifications in Schedule 4 to the Transport Act 1968) (Further Modification) (Amendment) Order 1993 (S.I. 1993/2909)
- Education (Mandatory Awards) (No. 2) Regulations 1993 (S.I. 1993/2914)
- Education (Student Loans) (No.2) Regulations 1993 (S.I. 1993/2915)
- Forth Ports Authority (Dissolution) Order 1993 (S.I. 1993/2916)
- A43 Trunk Road (Weldon Bypass) Order 1993 (S.I. 1993/2917)
- A43 Trunk Road (Stamford Road, Northamptonshire) (Detrunking) Order 1993 (S.I. 1993/2918)
- Firearms (Amendment) Act 1988 (Firearms Consultative Committee) Order 1993 (S.I. 1993/2919)
- Bovine Embryo Collection and Transfer (Fees) Regulations 1993 (S.I. 1993/2920)
- Bovine Embryo Collection and Transfer Regulations 1993 (S.I. 1993/2921)
- Consumer Credit (Exempt Agreements) (Amendment) (No. 2) Order 1993 (S.I. 1993/2922)
- Imitation Dummies (Safety) Regulations 1993 (S.I. 1993/2923)
- Hill Livestock (Compensatory Allowances) (Amendment) (No. 2) Regulations 1993 (S.I. 1993/2924)
- Social Security (Contributions) Amendment (No. 7) Regulations 1993 (S.I. 1993/2925)
- Dundee Healthcare National Health Service Trust (Establishment) Order 1993 (S.I. 1993/2926)
- Falkirk and District Royal Infirmary National Health Service Trust (Establishment) Order 1993 (S.I. 1993/2927)
- Hairmyres and Stonehouse Hospitals National Health Service Trust (Establishment) Order 1993 (S.I. 1993/2928)
- Law Hospital National Health Service Trust (Establishment) Order 1993 (S.I. 1993/2929)
- Perth and Kinross Healthcare National Health Service Trust (Establishment) Order 1993 (S.I. 1993/2930)
- East and Midlothian National Health Service Trust (Establishment) Order 1993 (S.I. 1993/2931)
- Royal Infirmary of Edinburgh National Health Service Trust (Establishment) Order 1993 (S.I. 1993/2932)
- Western General Hospitals National Health Service Trust (Establishment) Order 1993 (S.I. 1993/2933)
- Dumfries and Galloway Acute and Maternity Hospitals National Health Service Trust (Establishment) Order 1993 (S.I. 1993/2934)
- Glasgow Community and Mental Health Services National Health Service Trust (Establishment) Order 1993 (S.I. 1993/2935)
- Edinburgh Sick Children's National Health Service Trust (Establishment) Order 1993 (S.I. 1993/2936)
- Fife Healthcare National Health Service Trust (Establishment) Order 1993 (S.I. 1993/2937)
- Edinburgh Healthcare National Health Service Trust (Establishment) Order 1993 (S.I. 1993/2938)
- Petroleum Revenue Tax (Nomination Scheme for Disposals and Appropriations) (Amendment) Regulations 1993 (S.I. 1993/2939)
- A604(M) Motorway (Alconbury to A1(M) Section) And Connecting Roads Scheme 1993 (S.I. 1993/2940)
- A604 Trunk Road (Alconbury to A1 Improvement) (Detrunking) Order 1993 (S.I. 1993/2941)
- A604 Trunk Road (Alconbury to A1 Improvement and Slip Roads) Order 1993 (S.I. 1993/2942)
- A1 Trunk Road (Alconbury to Fletton Parkway Improvement and Slip Roads) Order 1993 (S.I. 1993/2943)
- A1(M) Motorway (Alconbury to Fletton Parkway Section) and Connecting Roads Scheme 1993 (S.I. 1993/2944)
- A1 Trunk Road (Alconbury to Fletton Parkway Improvement) (Detrunking) Order 1993 (S.I. 1993/2945)
- Fire Services (Appointments and Promotion) (Amendment) Regulations 1993 (S.I. 1993/2946)
- Capital Gains Tax (Annual Exempt Amount) (No. 2) Order 1993 (S.I. 1993/2947)
- Income Tax (Indexation) (No. 2) Order 1993 (S.I. 1993/2948)
- Inheritance Tax (Indexation) (No. 2) Order 1993 (S.I. 1993/2949)
- Retirement Benefits Schemes (Indexation of Earnings Cap) (No. 2) Order 1993 (S.I. 1993/2950)
- Value Added Tax (Cars) (Amendment) Order 1993 (S.I. 1993/2951)
- Value Added Tax (Increase of Consideration for Fuel) (No. 2) Order 1993 (S.I. 1993/2952)
- Value Added Tax (Increase of Registration Limits) (No. 2) Order 1993 (S.I. 1993/2953)
- Value Added Tax (Input Tax) (Amendment) Order 1993 (S.I. 1993/2954)
- London–Holyhead Trunk Road (Corwen and Pont Corwen to Pont Melin–Rug Diversions, Variation) Order 1993 (S.I. 1993/2955)
- Animals (Scientific Procedures) Act (Fees) Order 1993 (S.I. 1993/2956)
- Sheriff Court Fees Amendment (No.2) Order 1993 (S.I. 1993/2957)
- A10 Trunk Road (Wadesmill, High Cross and Colliers End Bypass and Slip Road) Order 1993 (S.I. 1993/2963)
- A10 Trunk Road (North of Ware to South of Puckeridge) (Detrunking) Order 1993 (S.I. 1993/2964)
- Education (School Inspection) (Wales) (No. 2) (Amendment) Regulations 1993 (S.I. 1993/2968)
- Scottish College of Textiles (Scotland) Order of Council 1993 (S.I. 1993/2969)
- Civil Aviation (Route Charges for Navigation Services) (Amendment) Regulations 1993 (S.I. 1993/2970)
- Hereford and Worcester and West Midlands (County Boundaries) Order 1993 (S.I. 1993/2971)
- National Health Service (Service Committees and Tribunal) Amendment Regulations 1993 (S.I. 1993/2972)
- Education (School Inspection) (No. 2) (Amendment) Regulations 1993 (S.I. 1993/2973)
- Port of Bristol Harbour Revision Order 1993 (S.I. 1993/2974)
- Civil Aviation (Joint Financing) (Fifth Amendment) Regulations 1993 (S.I. 1993/2975)
- Gipsy Encampments (East Yorkshire Borough of Beverley) Order 1993 (S.I. 1993/2980)

=== 3000-3499 ===
==== 3000–3099 ====
- Motor Vehicles (Tests) (Amendment) Regulations 1993 (S.I. 1993/3011)
- Public Service Vehicles (Conditions of Fitness, Equipment, Use and Certification) (Amendment) Regulations 1993 (S.I. 1993/3012)
- Goods Vehicles (Plating and Testing) (Amendment) (No. 2) Regulations 1993 (S.I. 1993/3013)
- Community Customs Code (Consequential Amendment of References) Regulations 1993 (S.I. 1993/3014)
- Statistics of Trade (Customs and Excise) (Amendment No. 2) Regulations 1993 (S.I. 1993/3015)
- Retirement Benefits Schemes (Restriction on Discretion to Approve) (Additional Voluntary Contributions) Regulations 1993 (S.I. 1993/3016)
- Advice and Assistance (Scotland) (Prospective Cost) Revocation Regulations 1993 (S.I. 1993/3017)
- Inverclyde Royal National Health Service Trust (Establishment) Order 1993 (S.I. 1993/3018)
- Kirkcaldy Acute Hospitals National Health Service Trust (Establishment) Order 1993 (S.I. 1993/3019)
- Queen Margaret Hospital National Health Service Trust (Establishment) Order 1993 (S.I. 1993/3020)
- Stobhill National Health Service Trust (Establishment) Order 1993 (S.I. 1993/3021)
- Angus National Health Service Trust (Establishment) Order 1993 (S.I. 1993/3022)
- Glasgow Royal Infirmary University National Health Service Trust (Establishment) Order 1993 (S.I. 1993/3023)
- Renfrewshire Healthcare National Health Service Trust (Establishment) Order 1993 (S.I. 1993/3024)
- West Glasgow Hospitals University National Health Service Trust (Establishment) Order 1993 (S.I. 1993/3025)
- Highland Communities National Health Service Trust (Establishment) Order 1993 (S.I. 1993/3026)
- Value Added Tax (General) (Amendment) (No.7) Regulations 1993 (S.I. 1993/3027)
- Value Added Tax (Cash Accounting) (Amendment) (No. 2) Regulations 1993 (S.I. 1993/3028)
- Trade Marks and Service Marks (Fees) (Amendment) Rules 1993 (S.I. 1993/3029)
- Local Government Superannuation (Educational Institutions) Regulations 1993 (S.I. 1993/3030)
- Transfrontier Shipment of Radioactive Waste Regulations 1993 (S.I. 1993/3031)
- Gipsy Encampments (Metropolitan District of Salford) Order 1993 (S.I. 1993/3032)
- A564 Trunk Road Stoke—Derby Route (Doveridge Bypass and Slip Roads) Order 1993 (S.I. 1993/3033)
- A564 Trunk Road Stoke—Derby Route (Doveridge Bypass) (Detrunking) Order 1993 (S.I. 1993/3034)
- Local Government Act 1988 (Defined Activities) (Exemption) (Cambridge City Council) Order 1993 (S.I. 1993/3035)
- Sheep Annual Premium and Suckler Cow Premium Quotas (Amendment) Regulations 1993 (S.I. 1993/3036)
- Census of Production Order 1993 (S.I. 1993/3037)
- Licensing of Air Carriers (Second Amendment and Other Provisions) Regulations 1993 (S.I. 1993/3039)
- Access for Community Air Carriers to Intra-Community Air Routes (Amendment and Other Provisions) Regulations 1993 (S.I. 1993/3040)
- Air Fares (Second Amendment) Regulations 1993 (S.I. 1993/3041)
- Airports Slot Allocation (Amendment) Regulations 1993 (S.I. 1993/3042)
- Local Government Superannuation (Membership) Regulations 1993 (S.I. 1993/3043)
- Local Government Superannuation (Scotland) Amendment (No.3) Regulations 1993 (S.I. 1993/3044)
- Land Registration (Leasehold Reform) Rules 1993 (S.I. 1993/3045)
- Broadcasting (Prescribed Countries) (Amendment) Order 1993 (S.I. 1993/3046)
- Broadcasting (Foreign Satellite Programmes) (Specified Countries) (Amendment) Order 1993 (S.I. 1993/3047)
- Road Vehicles (Construction and Use) (Amendment) (No. 3) Regulations 1993 (S.I. 1993/3048)
- Public Lending Right Scheme 1982 (Commencement of Variation) Order 1993 (S.I. 1993/3049)
- Notification of New Substances Regulations 1993 (S.I. 1993/3050)
- Hearing Aid Council Monetary Penalty (Increase) Order 1993 (S.I. 1993/3052)
- Commercial Agents (Council Directive) Regulations 1993 (S.I. 1993/3053)
- Local Authorities (Capital Finance) (Amendment) (No. 3) Regulations 1993 (S.I. 1993/3054)
- Income Tax (Interest Relief) (Qualifying Lenders) (No. 4) Order 1993 (S.I. 1993/3055)
- Education (University Commissioners) Order 1993 (S.I. 1993/3056)
- National Health Service Trusts (Consultation on Dissolution) (Scotland) Regulations 1993 (S.I. 1993/3057)
- Food Protection (Emergency Prohibitions) (Oil and Chemical Pollution of Fish) (No.2) (Partial Revocation No.2) Order 1993 (S.I. 1993/3058)
- Non-Domestic Rating Contributions (Scotland) Amendment Regulations 1993 (S.I. 1993/3059)
- New Town (Livingston) Winding Up Order 1993 (S.I. 1993/3060)
- New Town (Irvine) Winding Up Order 1993 (S.I. 1993/3061)
- New Town (Cumbernauld) Winding Up Order 1993 (S.I. 1993/3062)
- Herring (Specified Sea Areas) (Prohibition of Fishing) Order 1993 (S.I. 1993/3063)
- Passenger and Goods Vehicles (Recording Equipment) (Approval of Fitters and Workshops) (Fees) (Amendment) Regulations 1993 (S.I. 1993/3066)
- International Carriage of Dangerous Goods by Road (Fees) (Amendment) Regulations 1993 (S.I. 1993/3067)
- International Transport of Goods under Cover of TIR Carnets (Fees) (Amendment) Regulations 1993 (S.I. 1993/3068)
- Children (Homes, Arrangements for Placement, Reviews and Representations) (Miscellaneous Amendments) Regulations 1993 (S.I. 1993/3069)
- Education (Publication of Schemes for Financing Schools) Regulations 1993 (S.I. 1993/3070)
- Common Agricultural Policy (Wine) (Amendment) Regulations 1993 (S.I. 1993/3071)
- Education (Acquisition of Grant–maintained Status) (Transitional Functions) Regulations 1993 (S.I. 1993/3072)
- Education (Grant–maintained Schools) (Loans) Regulations 1993 (S.I. 1993/3073)
- Personal Protective Equipment (EC Directive) (Amendment) Regulations 1993 (S.I. 1993/3074)
- Prison (Amendment) (No. 2) Rules 1993 (S.I. 1993/3075)
- Young Offender Institution (Amendment) Rules 1993 (S.I. 1993/3076)
- Non–Domestic Rating Contributions (Wales) (Amendment) (No. 2) Regulations 1993 (S.I. 1993/3077)
- A1 Trunk Road (Holloway Road, Islington) (Prescribed Routes) Order 1993 (S.I. 1993/3078)
- Fire Services (Appointments and Promotion) (Scotland) Amendment Regulations 1993 (S.I. 1993/3079)
- Act of Sederunt (Fees of Solicitors in the Sheriff Court) (Amendment and Further Provisions) 1993 (S.I. 1993/3080)
- Police (Scotland) Amendment Regulations 1993 (S.I. 1993/3081)
- Non-Domestic Rating Contributions (England) (Amendment) (No. 2) Regulations 1993 (S.I. 1993/3082)
- Boiler (Efficiency) Regulations 1993 (S.I. 1993/3083)
- Friendly Societies Act 1992 (Transitional and Consequential Provisions) Regulations 1993 (S.I. 1993/3084)
- Welfare of Animals at Markets (Amendment) Order 1993 (S.I. 1993/3085)
- Diseases of Animals (Approved Disinfectants) (Amendment) (No. 2) Order 1993 (S.I. 1993/3086)
- Civil Aviation (Route Charges for Navigation Services) (Second Amendment) Regulations 1993 (S.I. 1993/3098)

==== 3100–3199 ====
- Credit Unions (Authorised Investments) Order 1993 (S.I. 1993/3100)
- Education (Schools Conducted by Education Associations) (Initial Articles of Government) Regulations 1993 (S.I. 1993/3101)
- Education (Grant-maintained Schools) (Initial Governing Instruments) Regulations 1993 (S.I. 1993/3102)
- Education (Schools Conducted by Education Associations) Regulations 1993 (S.I. 1993/3103)
- Education (Application of Financing Schemes to Special Schools) Regulations 1993 (S.I. 1993/3104)
- Education (School Curriculum and Assessment Authority) (Orders for Transfer of Property and Staff) Order 1993 (S.I. 1993/3105)
- Education Act 1993 (Commencement No. 2 and Transitional Provisions) Order 1993 (S.I. 1993/3106)
- Education (School Government) (Amendment) Regulations 1993 (S.I. 1993/3107)
- Local Government (Compensation for Premature Retirement) (Amendment) (No. 2) Regulations 1993 (S.I. 1993/3108)
- Insurance Companies (Pension Business) (Transitional Provisions) (Amendment) Regulations 1993 (S.I. 1993/3109)
- Stamp Duty Reserve Tax (Amendment) Regulations 1993 (S.I. 1993/3110)
- Friendly Societies (Modification of the Corporation Tax Acts) (Amendment) Regulations 1993 (S.I. 1993/3111)
- Friendly Societies (Provisional Repayments for Exempt Business) Regulations 1993 (S.I. 1993/3112)
- Education (Publication of School Proposals and Notices) Regulations 1993 (S.I. 1993/3113)
- Education Assets Board (Transfers under the Education Reform Act 1988) (Amendment) Regulations 1993 (S.I. 1993/3114)
- Education (Annual Consideration of Ballot on Grant-Maintained Status) (England) Order 1993 (S.I. 1993/3115)
- Registration of Births, Deaths and Marriages (Fees) Order 1993 (S.I. 1993/3116)
- Vocational Training (Tax Relief) (Amendment No. 2) Regulations 1993 (S.I. 1993/3118)
- Foot–and–Mouth Disease (Amendment) (No. 2) Order 1993 (S.I. 1993/3119)
- Civil Courts (Amendment No. 2) Order 1993 (S.I. 1993/3120)
- Income Support (General) Amendment (No. 4) Regulations 1993 (S.I. 1993/3121)
- Appointment of Judges as Arbiters (Fees) (Scotland) Order 1993 (S.I. 1993/3125)
- Insurance Companies (Switzerland) Regulations 1993 (S.I. 1993/3127)
- Act of Sederunt (Summary Suspension) 1993 (S.I. 1993/3128)
- Durham and Tyne and Wear (County and District Boundaries) (Variation) Order 1993 (S.I. 1993/3129)
- National Savings Bank (Amendment) Regulations 1993 (S.I. 1993/3130)
- National Savings Stock Register (Amendment) (No. 2) Regulations 1993 (S.I. 1993/3131)
- Savings Certificates (Yearly Plan) (Amendment) Regulations 1993 (S.I. 1993/3132)
- Savings Certificates (Amendment) Regulations 1993 (S.I. 1993/3133)
- Severn Bridges Tolls Order 1993 (S.I. 1993/3135)
- Environmentally Sensitive Areas (Argyll Islands) Designation Order 1993 (S.I. 1993/3136)
- Merchant Shipping (Registration, etc.) Act 1993 (Commencement No. 1 and Transitional Provisions) Order 1993 (S.I. 1993/3137)
- Merchant Shipping (Registration of Ships) Regulations 1993 (S.I. 1993/3138)
- Combined Probation Areas (Suffolk) Order 1993 (S.I. 1993/3139)
- Mid Essex Community Health National Health Service Trust Dissolution Order 1993 (S.I. 1993/3140)
- New Possibilities National Health Service Trust Dissolution Order 1993 (S.I. 1993/3141)
- Combined Probation Areas (Kent) Order 1993 (S.I. 1993/3142)
- Cayman Islands (Constitution) (Amendment) Order 1993 (S.I. 1993/3143)
- Child Abduction and Custody (Parties to Conventions) Order 1993 (S.I. 1993/3144)
- Hong Kong (Legislative Powers) (Amendment) Order 1993 (S.I. 1993/3145)
- Criminal Justice (Confiscation) (Northern Ireland) Order 1993 (S.I. 1993/3146)
- Criminal Justice Act 1988 (Designated Countries and Territories) (Amendment) (No. 2) Order 1993 (S.I. 1993/3147)
- Criminal Justice (International Co–operation) Act 1990 (Enforcement of Overseas Forfeiture Orders) (Amendment) (No. 2) Order 1993 (S.I. 1993/3148)
- Environmentally Sensitive Areas (Machair of the Uists and Benbecula, Barra and Vatersay) Designation Order 1993 (S.I. 1993/3149)
- Environmentally Sensitive Areas (Shetland Islands) Designation Order 1993 (S.I. 1993/3150)
- Registration of Births, Deaths and Marriages (Fees) (Scotland) Order 1993 (S.I. 1993/3151)
- Marriage Fees (Scotland) Regulations 1993 (S.I. 1993/3152)
- Registration of Births, Deaths, Marriages and Divorces (Fees) (Scotland) Regulations 1993 (S.I. 1993/3153)
- Maximum Number of Judges (Scotland) Order 1993 (S.I. 1993/3154)
- Criminal Justice (International Co-operation) Act 1990 (Enforcement of Overseas Forfeiture Orders) (Scotland) Amendment (No.2) Order 1993 (S.I. 1993/3155)
- Confiscation of the Proceeds of Drug Trafficking (Designated Countries and Territories) (Scotland) Amendment (No.2) Order 1993 (S.I. 1993/3156)
- European Communities (Definition of Treaties) (European Investment Fund) Order 1993 (S.I. 1993/3157)
- Drug Trafficking Offences Act 1986 (Designated Countries and Territories) (Amendment) (No. 2) Order 1993 (S.I. 1993/3158)
- Environment and Safety Information (Northern Ireland) Order 1993 (S.I. 1993/3159)
- Roads (Northern Ireland) Order 1993 (S.I. 1993/3160)
- Merchant Shipping (Fire Protection) (Non-United Kingdom) (Non-SOLAS Ships) (Amendment) Rules 1993 (S.I. 1993/3161)
- Merchant Shipping (Fire Appliances) (Amendment) Regulations 1993 (S.I. 1993/3162)
- Merchant Shipping (Fire Protection) (Amendment) Regulations 1993 (S.I. 1993/3163)
- Merchant Shipping (Fire Protection) (Ships Built Before 25 May 1980) (Amendment) Regulations 1993 (S.I. 1993/3164)
- Water and Sewerage Services (Amendment) (Northern Ireland) Order 1993 (S.I. 1993/3165)
- Ministerial and other Salaries Order 1993 (S.I. 1993/3166)
- Redundancy Payments (National Health Service) (Modification) Order 1993 (S.I. 1993/3167)
- Finance Act 1985 (Interest on Tax) (Prescribed Rate) (No. 2) Order 1993 (S.I. 1993/3168)
- Local Government Act 1992 (Commencement No. 3) Order 1993 (S.I. 1993/3169)
- Town and Country Planning (Fees for Applications and Deemed Applications) (Amendment) Regulations 1993 (S.I. 1993/3170)
- Taxes (Interest Rate) (Amendment No. 4) Regulations 1993 (S.I. 1993/3171)
- National Health Service (General Dental Services) Amendment (No. 2) Regulations 1993 (S.I. 1993/3172)
- Commercial Agents (Council Directive) (Amendment) Regulations 1993 (S.I. 1993/3173)
- Education (Individual Pupils' Achievements) (Information) Regulations 1993 (S.I. 1993/3182)
- Education (European Economic Area) (Amendment) Regulations 1993 (S.I. 1993/3183)
- Education (European Economic Area) (Scotland) Regulations 1993 (S.I. 1993/3184)
- Liquor Licensing (Fees) (Scotland) Order 1993 (S.I. 1993/3185)
- Advice and Assistance (Assistance by Way of Representation) (Scotland) Amendment (No. 2) Regulations 1993 (S.I. 1993/3186)
- Advice and Assistance (Financial Limit) (Scotland) Regulations 1993 (S.I. 1993/3187)
- Education (Grant–maintained Schools) (Initial Sponsor Governors) Regulations 1993 (S.I. 1993/3188)
- Education (Acquisition of Grant-maintained Status) (Ballot Information) Regulations 1993 (S.I. 1993/3189)
- Supreme Court Fees (Amendment) Order 1993 (S.I. 1993/3191)
- Cod and Saithe (Specified Sea Areas) (Prohibition of Fishing) Order 1993 (S.I. 1993/3192)
- Haddock, Hake, Nephrops, Plaice and Sole (Specified Sea Areas) (Prohibition of Fishing) Order 1993 (S.I. 1993/3193)
- Social Security (Severe Disablement Allowance) Amendment Regulations 1993 (S.I. 1993/3194)
- Doncaster Borough Council (North Bridge Relief Road) (Crossing of Navigable Waterway (Sheffield and South Yorkshire Navigation River Don New Cut)) Scheme 1991 Confirmation Instrument 1993 (S.I. 1993/3195)
- Education (Distribution by Schools of Information about Further Education Institutions) (England) Regulations 1993 (S.I. 1993/3197)
- Nitrate Sensitive Areas (Designation) (Amendment) Order 1993 (S.I. 1993/3198)
- Broadcasting (Restrictions on the Holding of Licences) (Amendment) Order 1993 (S.I. 1993/3199)

==== 3200–3299 ====
- A3 Trunk Road (Robin Hood Way (South) Service Road, Kingston upon Thames) (Prescribed Routes) Order 1993 (S.I. 1993/3201)
- Town and Country Planning (Fees for Applications and Deemed Applications) (Scotland) Amendment Regulations 1993 (S.I. 1993/3211)
- Lottery Duty Regulations 1993 (S.I. 1993/3212)
- Plant Health (Great Britain) (Amendment) (Potatoes) Order 1993 (S.I. 1993/3213)
- Upper Spey and Associated Waters Protection (Renewal) Order 1993 (S.I. 1993/3216)
- A6 Trunk Road (Rushden and Higham Ferrers Bypass) Order 1993 (S.I. 1993/3217)
- A6 Trunk Road (Rushden and Higham Ferrers Bypass) (Detrunking) Order 1993 (S.I. 1993/3218)
- Occupational Pension Schemes (Transitional Provisions) (Amendment) Regulations 1993 (S.I. 1993/3219)
- Retirement Benefits Schemes (Continuation of Rights of Members of Approved Schemes) (Amendment) Regulations 1993 (S.I. 1993/3220)
- Retirement Benefits Schemes (Tax Relief on Contributions) (Disapplication of Earnings Cap) (Amendment) Regulations 1993 (S.I. 1993/3221)
- Exempt Entertainments (Variation of Monetary Limit) Order 1993 (S.I. 1993/3222)
- Lotteries Regulations 1993 (S.I. 1993/3223)
- Lotteries (Gaming Board Fees) Order 1993 (S.I. 1993/3224)
- Banking Coordination (Second Council Directive) (Amendment) Regulations 1993 (S.I. 1993/3225)
- Friendly Societies Act 1992 (Commencement No. 7 and Transitional Provisions and Savings) Order 1993 (S.I. 1993/3226)
- Utilities Supply and Works Contracts (Amendment) Regulations 1993 (S.I. 1993/3227)
- Public Services Contracts Regulations 1993 (S.I. 1993/3228)
- Land Registration Fees Order 1993 (S.I. 1993/3229)
- Milk Marketing Board Scheme of Reorganisation (Extension of Period for Application) Order 1993 (S.I. 1993/3230)
- Merchant Shipping (Musters and Training) (Amendment) Regulations 1993 (S.I. 1993/3231)
- Merchant Shipping (Pilot Ladders and Hoists) (Amendment) Regulations 1993 (S.I. 1993/3232)
- Dairy Produce Quotas (Amendment) Regulations 1993 (S.I. 1993/3234)
- Pensions Increase (Approved Schemes) (National Health Service) (Scotland) Amendment Regulations 1993 (S.I. 1993/3235)
- Council Tax (Transitional Reduction Scheme) (Scotland) (No.2) Regulations 1993 (S.I. 1993/3236)
- Railways Act 1993 (Commencement No. 1) Order 1993 (S.I. 1993/3237)
- Road Traffic Act 1991 (Commencement No. 9 and Transitional Provisions) Order 1993 (S.I. 1993/3238)
- Road Traffic (Special Parking Areas) (London Boroughs of Richmond upon Thames and Southwark) Order 1993 (S.I. 1993/3239)
- Act of Sederunt (Sheriff Court Summary Application Rules) 1993 (S.I. 1993/3240)
- Insurance Accounts Directive (Miscellaneous Insurance Undertakings) Regulations 1993 (S.I. 1993/3245)
- Companies Act 1985 (Insurance Companies Accounts) Regulations 1993 (S.I. 1993/3246)
- Animals and Animal Products (Import and Export) Regulations 1993 (S.I. 1993/3247)
- Artificial Breeding of Sheep and Goats Regulations 1993 (S.I. 1993/3248)
- Importation of Bees (Amendment) Order 1993 (S.I. 1993/3249)
- Specified Animal Pathogens Order 1993 (S.I. 1993/3250)
- Parliamentary Pensions (Additional Voluntary Contributions Scheme) Regulations 1993 (S.I. 1993/3252)
- Parliamentary Pensions (Consolidation and Amendment) Regulations 1993 (S.I. 1993/3253)
- Customs Duties (ECSC) (Quota and other Reliefs) Order 1993 (S.I. 1993/3254)
- Medicines (Products Other Than Veterinary Drugs) (Prescription Only) Amendment (No. 2) Order 1993 (S.I. 1993/3256)
- Tribunals and Inquiries (Friendly Societies) Order 1993 (S.I. 1993/3258)
- Cardiff—Glan Conwy Trunk Road (A470) (Pentrebach—Cefn Coed Diversion) Order 1993 (S.I. 1993/3259)
- London Borough of Hackney (Lea Bridge-Cycle/Footbridge) Scheme 1993 Confirmation Instrument 1993 (S.I. 1993/3260)
- M42 Motorway (Junction 6 Southbound Off-Slip Road to Eastway) Scheme 1993 (S.I. 1993/3261)
- Export of Goods (Control) (Amendment No. 6) Order 1993 (S.I. 1993/3264)
- County Court (Amendment No. 4) Rules 1993 (S.I. 1993/3273)
- Land Registration Rules 1993 (S.I. 1993/3275)
- Land Registration (Official Searches) Rules 1993 (S.I. 1993/3276)

== See also ==
- List of statutory instruments of the United Kingdom
