= Cross of Wales =

Processional cross

The Cross of Wales (Welsh: Croes Cymru) is a processional cross made at the behest of King Charles III as a gift to the Church in Wales on its centenary. The silver cross features two relics of the True Cross presented to Charles by Pope Francis. The cross led the procession into Westminster Abbey for the 6 May 2023 Coronation of King Charles III and Queen Camilla.

== History ==
The Cross of Wales was announced in 2021 as a gift from Charles III (then the Prince of Wales) to the Anglican Church in Wales to mark their centenary the year before. The cross was blessed by Archbishop of Wales Andy John at Holy Trinity Church, Llandudno, on 19 April 2023. It led the procession into Westminster Abbey for the Coronation of Charles III and Camilla on 6 May 2023. After the coronation, the cross was formally presented to the Church in Wales. Its use will be shared with the Catholic Church in Wales as a symbol of cooperation between the two groups.

== Description and manufacture ==
The cross was commissioned by the London-based Worshipful Company of Goldsmiths and is inspired by mediaeval Welsh artwork. The cross was designed and made by silversmith Michael Lloyd, in consultation with the Royal Collection. Lloyd used the chased silver technique, and said it had taken 267,000 hammer blows to make. The silver for the cross is from recycled bullion by the Llantrisant-based Royal Mint. The cross was hallmarked by the London Assay Office, with Charles III applying the Royal Mark of a leopard's head at Goldsmiths' Hall in London in November 2022.

The rear of the cross is inscribed with text taken from the last sermon of Saint David, patron saint of Wales. In Welsh it reads "Byddwch lawen. Cadwch y ffydd. Gwnewch y Pethau Bychain", ("Be joyful. Keep the faith. Do the little things"). The cross is mounted on a shaft made from wind-fallen Welsh timber and has a stand made of Welsh slate. The centre of the cross features a reliquary, with red backing material and rose crystal, containing the two relics of the True Cross. The relics measure 10 millimetres (0.39 in) and 5 millimetres (0.20 in) in length, and are set in a cruciform pattern. The shards were gifted to Charles by Pope Francis to mark his coronation.

The shaft of the cross was made by Darren Crisp, Woodturner and Artist in Wood, it is turned form three pieces of Welsh Oak, he also treated and coloured the pieces along with the timber used in the core of the cross.

It was officially handed over to the Archbishop of Wales, The Most Reverend Andrew John, on 25 January 2024, the feast of St Dwynwen, the Welsh Patron Saints of Lovers.
