= York Assay Office =

The York Assay Office was an institution set up to assay (test the purity of) precious metals in the city of York, England. Though silver marks associated with York are known from around 1410, York was granted its own right to assay silver in a 1423 Act under Henry VI. Silver was then assayed in York until 1716, when the office closed for the first time, apparently due to an economic decline in the city. The office reopened c. 1776, with production concentrated among a few prolific makers until a final closure around 1857.

== History ==
=== Background and establishment ===
Marks indicating that an item meets the sterling silver standard (92.5% pure silver) have been required on all silver items made in England since 1300. 'Guardians of craft' (assay masters) were employed to mark the item with a leopard's head. Edward I granted a charter to the Worshipful Company of Goldsmiths in 1321, though it is believed they were operating unofficially before this date. Working out of Goldsmith's Hall in London, their assay marks began to be known as 'hallmarks', and the Hall was in effect the first English assay office.

Silversmiths located far from London suffered practical difficulties in sending their silver items to London for assay, and in many cases this did not happen. Of these early provincial centres of silver production, York was the foremost. The first record of a goldsmith working in York is from a late 12th century Latin document, in which a man named Robert is referred to as aurifaber.

=== 1423–1716 ===
York was granted the authority to assay silver in 1423. The first recorded York town-mark was half a fleur-de-lys and half a leopard's head.

All English provincial assay offices, including York, were suspended in 1697 after the introduction of the Britannia standard (95.84% pure silver), which replaced the sterling standard as part of the Great Recoinage of 1696. The closed assay offices, including York, were reopened in a 1701 Act of Parliament. At this stage the York city mark changed to reflect the City Arms. The city mark is however frequently omitted from silver of this period, especially from smaller items of silver such as flatware.

The York Assay Office closed c. 1716 due to an economic decline in the city which lessened demand for silver items. Two goldsmiths, John Langwith and Joseph Buckle, had their works assayed at Newcastle thereafter, though only for five years.

=== 1776–1858 ===
By c. 1776 demand had risen and the York Assay Office was reopened. This occurred despite the opening in 1773 of the Sheffield Assay Office, 50 miles to the south.

In the final period of the York Assay Office, the assay masters were often employees of the silversmiths working in York. In 1851 James Barber (one of the most prolific York silversmiths) was Prime Warden and John Bell the other warden. John Burrill was Assay master, and worked as a silversmith for Barber. Burrill was called "a decayed spoon-maker" in a 1856 Report by the Inspector General of Stamps and Taxes, and "a worn-out spoonmaker" and "ignorant of the business" in a 1851 report by the London Goldsmiths Company. This conflict of interest had precedent in York, as a previous Assay Master, Thomas Stead, had also worked for Barber. This arrangement was criticised and drew the ire of the London Goldsmith's Company, who pushed for the closure of York and other provincial assay offices. Though malpractice was uncovered, such as the tools used for assay being found in a dirty corner of a tavern, York silversmiths were not accused of using substandard silver.

The exact date of the closure of the York Assay office is not known. However, after the death of James Barber and the failure of a continuance of his business by his son, only one firm of silversmiths were operating, and no York silver after 1858 is known. The Sheffield Assay office began using the White Rose of York as its town mark in 1975, though it has no connection with the defunct York Assay Office, which never used this mark.
