= Assay office =

Institution set up to test the purity of precious metals

Assay offices are institutions set up to assay (test the purity of) precious metals. This is often done to protect consumers from buying fake items. Upon successful completion of an assay (i.e. if the metallurgical content is found be equal or better than that claimed by the maker and it otherwise conforms to the prevailing law) the assay offices typically stamp a hallmark on the item to certify its metallurgical content. Hallmarking first appeared in France, with the Goldsmiths' Statute of 1260 promulgated under Étienne Boileau, Provost of Paris, for King Louis IX.

== US assay offices ==
Title 15, Chapter 8, Section 291 of the United States Code makes it unlawful to stamp goods in the United States with "United States assay" or any similar stamp which gives the impression that the item has been officially assayed by the United States government.

=== General overview and function of U.S. assay offices ===
Assay offices did and do exist in the U.S., but they are affiliated with the government's coinage mints and serve only the government's purposes in that field. They are not involved in hallmarking, as there has never been a hallmarking scheme in the U.S.

In the 1800s, the functions of assay offices in the U.S. included receiving bullion deposits from the public and from mining prospectors in the various American territories. The assay offices that still operate today function solely within national coining system (including bullion coinage for sales to investors).

=== US assay offices, current ===
Current U.S. assay offices include the following:

- The Philadelphia Mint – 1792 to date
- The Denver Mint – 1862 to date. It served as an assay office until 1906, when coinage operations began.
- The San Francisco Mint – 1852 to date. Coinage operations were suspended in March 1955, but the plant continued to operate as an assay office. In 1962, its official designation was changed from mint to assay office. Coinage operations were again authorized in 1965.
- The West Point, New York Bullion Depository – 1938 to date. It is operated as an adjunct of the New York Assay Office.

=== US assay offices, historical ===
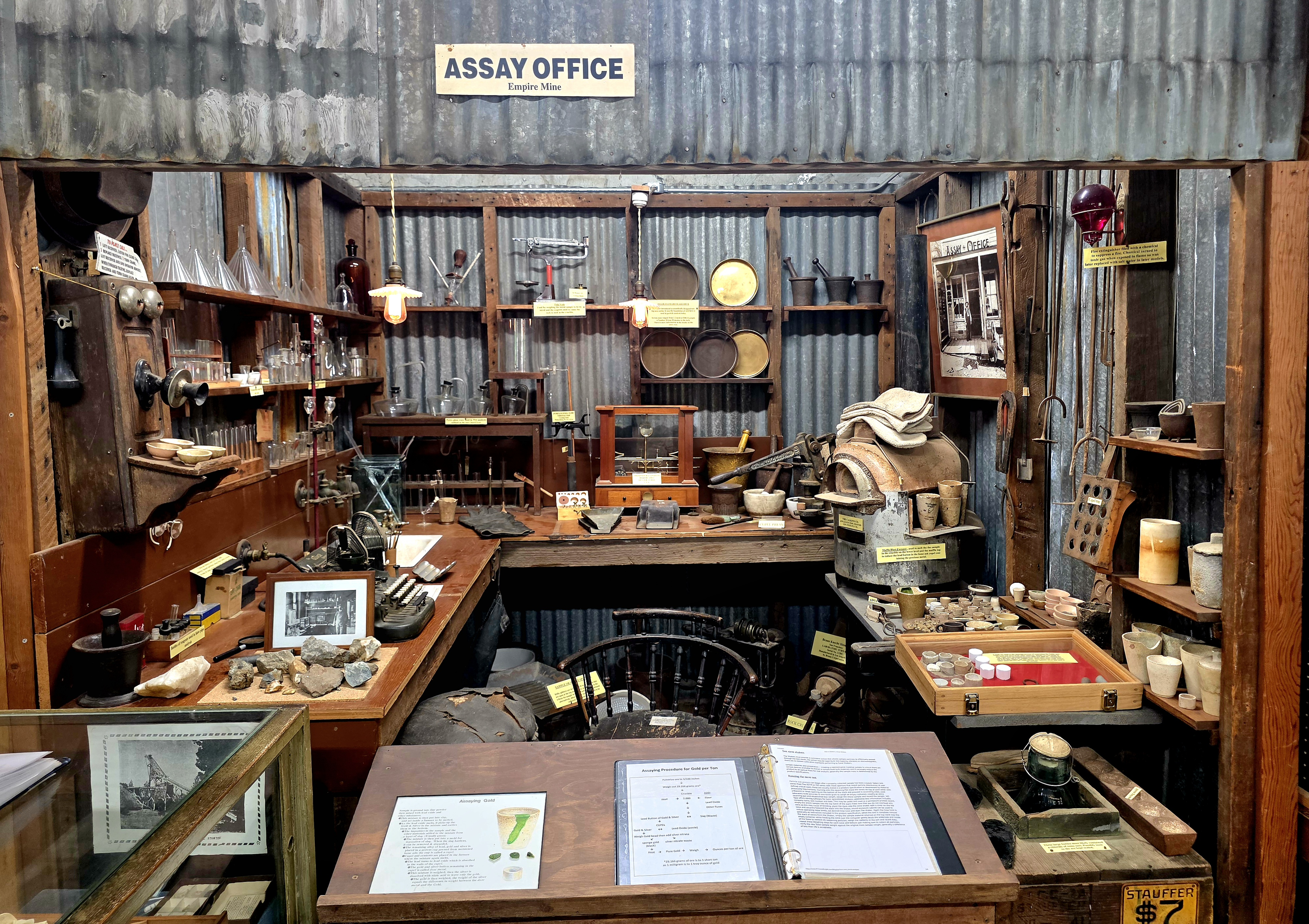
Private gold assay office of the Empire Mine in Grass Valley, California

- The Charlotte, North Carolina Mint – 1835 to 1861. After the Civil War, the plant was reopened in 1868 as an assay office until 1913, when it was ultimately closed.
- The New Orleans, Louisiana Mint – 1835 to 1942. Coinage operations were conducted here from 1838, but were suspended from 1861 until 1879; assay functions were performed from 1876. Coinage resumed in 1879 and continued until 1909. The facility operated as an assay office from 1909 until 1942, when it was closed.
- The U.S. Assay Office, St. Louis, Missouri – 1881 to 1911
- The U.S. Assay Office, Helena, Montana – 1874 to 1933
- The U.S. Assay Office, Salt Lake City, Utah – 1909 to 1933
- The U.S. Assay Office, Deadwood, South Dakota – 1898 to 1927
- The U.S. Assay Office, Boise, Idaho – 1869 to 1933
- The U.S. Assay Office, New York, New York – 1854 to 1982
- The U.S. Assay Office, Seattle, Washington – 1898 to 1955

== UK assay offices ==
=== General overview and function of UK assay offices ===
In the United Kingdom, the Hallmarking Act 1973 (c. 43) makes it an offence to describe as platinum, gold or silver an item which is not hallmarked as appropriate or exempt from hallmarking. In July 2009, following a proposal by the British Hallmarking Council, an amendment to the act also brought palladium under the hallmarking regime.

The first UK assay office was Goldsmiths' Hall, founded around 1300, and where the term "hallmarking" originates, meaning "marked in Goldsmiths' Hall". Since then, there have been ten assay offices in the UK.

There are four remaining assay offices in the UK:

=== Current assay offices ===
The assay office marks for London, Birmingham, Sheffield, and Edinburgh.

- London Assay Office
- Sheffield Assay Office
- Birmingham Assay Office
- Edinburgh Assay Office

=== Historic assay offices ===
- Chester (closed 24 August 1962)
- Dublin (1801-1922 part of UK system – see Dublin Assay Office)
- Exeter (closed 1883)
- Glasgow (closed 31 March 1964)
- Newcastle (closed 1884)
- Norwich (closed 1702)
- York (closed c.1857)

== Irish assay office ==
There is one assay office, the Dublin Assay Office.

== Dutch (Netherlands) assay office ==
=== General overview and function of the Dutch assay office ===
The Dutch (the Netherlands), who are members of the International Hallmarking Convention, have been striking hallmarks since at least 1814, and boast a 600-year history of hallmarking in Dutch territories. Like many other nations, the Dutch require the registration and use of Responsibility Marks since 1797. The Dutch also use a date letter code.

After the French defeat at Leipzig 1813 the Kingdom of the Netherlands was established. William VI, prince of Orange (known in Dutch as Willem Frederik), was proclaimed the sovereign. On March 15, 1815, with the support of the powers gathered at the Congress of Vienna, William proclaimed himself King William I of the Netherlands. He was also made grand duke of Luxembourg. The two countries remained separate despite sharing a common monarch. For our purposes, he retained much of the French legislation, including the precious metal guarantee law of November 9, 1787. On December 26, 1813, the precious metal laws were however, modified and the French hallmarks, the Gaul cockerels were replaced with Dutch lions. The existing guarantee offices were reopened after re-staffing and the production of the new hallmark dies. Willem abdicated in 1840. As of January 1, 1853, the out-of-date French guarantee law was replaced by a new Dutch law. This law of September 18, 1852, in a modified form (last modified in 1986 as the "Dutch Assay Law of 1986") is in still effective. As a result of the Benelux treaty the guarantee tax was abolished in 1953. At the same time gold and silver fineness standards were adapted to conform to international standards. Also the assaying of platinum was introduced in 1953.

In 1987, the assay system was privatized and since 1988 has been located in only an office at Gouda. The system is overseen by the Dutch Ministry of Economic Affairs which appointed Edelmetaal Waarborg Nederland B.V. as of March 11, 2002. In 1999, the Netherlands ratified the Vienna Convention on the Control of the Fineness and the Hallmarking of Precious Metal Objects.

Dutch hallmarks are recognized in Austria, France, Ireland, Portugal, Spain and the United Kingdom without further testing and have also been recognized in Belgium, Denmark, Finland and Sweden, which have voluntary hallmarking systems. All jewelry produced in the Netherlands or imported for the Dutch market must carry hallmarks.

=== Current assay office ===
There are two Dutch assay offices located in the city of Gouda and Joure. The Dutch recognize platinum, gold, silver and palladium as precious metals.

=== Historic Netherlands assay offices (up to 1988) ===
- Amsterdam
- The Hague
- Groningen
- Zwolle
- Breda
- Middleburg
- Maastricht
- Alkmaar
- Utrecht
- Rotterdam
- Leeuwarden
- Arnhem
- Den Bosch
- Schoonhoven
- Roermond
- Roosendaal
- Joure

== Swiss assay offices ==
=== General overview and function of Swiss assay offices ===
Only precious metal watch cases must be hallmarked in Switzerland. Swiss hallmarking for other articles such as jewelry and cutlery is optional. In addition to the Swiss hallmark, all precious metal goods may be stamped with the Common Control Mark of the Vienna Convention. Switzerland recognizes platinum, gold, silver and palladium as precious metals which may be hallmarked and thus are subject to assay.

=== Current Swiss assay offices ===
- Basel/Bâle
- Berne Central Bureau
- La Chaux-de-Fonds
- Chiasso
- Geneva (2 offices)
- Le Noirmont
- Schaffhausen
- Zürich(2 offices)

=== Historic Swiss assay offices ===
- Buchs
- Delémont
- Fleurier
- Granges/Grenchen
- St. Imier
- Le Locle
- Lausanne
- Madretsch
- Neuchâtel
- Porrentruy
- Romanshorn
- Tramelan

== Austrian assay office ==
There is one assay office at Vienna.

== Cypriot assay office ==
There is one assay office at Aradippou. The Law governing the marking of precious metal articles has been ratified by the House of Representatives in 1991, creating a new semi-Governmental Organisation, the Cyprus Organisation for the Hallmarking of precious metals. The Cyprus Assay Office (CAO) is under the jurisdiction of the Ministry of Commerce, Industry and Tourism. The Cyprus Hallmark consists of three compulsory symbols: 1. The manufacturer's mark - Consists of the initials of the manufacturer of the article surrounded by a small shield; 2. The fineness mark - The purity of the metal, in parts per thousand; 3. The official mark - the Head of Aphrodite until December 2001 and a ship as from January 2002 denotes that the article is made of gold, and the fish that the article is made of silver. The manufacturer's mark must be struck on the articles by the manufacturer before it is submitted to the Assay Office for hallmarking. The manufacturer may make arrangements for the manufacture's mark to be struck by the Assay Office upon submission of the article to be struck with the approved hallmarks. The manufacturer's mark which is registered under the relevant section of the law shall include the initial letters of the name or names of the manufacturer and shall be of such design as may be approved by the Assay Office. The standards of fineness of gold and silver articles that are hallmarked are for gold: 375, 585, 750 and 916 parts per thousand; for silver: 800, 830 and 925 parts per thousand; no negative tolerance is permitted on the above standards of fineness.

== The assay office of the Czech Republic ==
There is one assay office in Praha. Assay Office was established by the Czech National Council Law No. 19/1993 Coll., concerning the Administration Authorities of the Czech Republic in the Field of Hallmarking and Precious Metal Testing, from which the Assay Office competences and duties are resulting. The provision of the financing is included in the Law about Hallmarking and Precious Metal Testing (Hallmarking Act), No. 539/1992 Coll., and in the procedural Decree of the Federal Ministry of Economy (FME), No. 540/1992 Coll., according to which the Hallmarking Act is implemented.

== Danish assay office ==
There is one assay office at Brondby.

== Finnish assay office ==
There is one assay office at Espoo. The assay office is privatized and the concession was awarded to Inspecta Corporation is an independent, international qualification requirements fulfilling inspection, testing, measurement and certification services provider.

== Hungarian assay office ==
There is one assay office at Budapest.

== Latvian assay office ==
There is one assay office at Riga.

== Lithuanian assay office ==
There is one assay office at Druskininkai.

== Norwegian assay office ==
Norwegian Assay Office is part of Justervesenet, located at Kjeller, just outside Oslo.

== Polish assay offices ==
There are ten assay offices at:

- Białystok
- Bydgoszcz
- Cracow
- Chorzów
- Częstochowa
- Gdańsk
- Łódź
- Poznań
- Warsaw
- Wrocław

Polish Assay Offices test and mark precious metal alloy articles (gold, silver and platinum group metals). They also supervise compliance with Hallmarking Law at processing plants and precious metal alloy sales points. All Assay Offices must report to the Central Office of Measures.

== Portuguese assay offices ==
There are two assay offices at

- Lisboa
- Porto

== Slovak assay offices ==
There is one Assay Office with four Branches at:

- Bratislava
- Kosice
- Levice
- Trencin

== Swedish assay office ==
The Swedish assay office, the SP Technical Research Institute of Sweden, is in Borås. The assay office is privatized and the concession, given to the Inspecta Corporation, is an independent, international qualification requirements fulfilling inspection, testing, measurement and certification services provider. Inspecta is accredited by SWEDAC.

== Bahrain assay office ==
The Directorate of Precious Metals & Gemstone Testing is one of fourteen directorates forming the Ministry of Industry, Commerce and Tourism. The directorate itself is composed of two sections that deal with assaying and gemmology and the three main functions of the directorate as a whole are:

1. Serving the trade and public with their gemmological and assaying needs.

2. Overseeing the local jewellery sector to ensure that traders adhere to national and international laws and nomenclature.

3. Protecting consumers and the trade from fraud within the market place.

The two sections of the Directorate deal with all aspects of gemmology and precious metal assaying and have existed for over a decade. The Assay Office was established in 1979 via Amiri Decree No.19 and the Gem & Pearl Testing Laboratory followed in 1990 via Amiri Decree No. 10.

Both sections were amongst the first to be established in the Middle East and since their establishment they have developed a positive reputation within the Middle East and beyond.

== Japanese assay office ==
Japan has one assay office, situated at the Saitama branch of Japan Mint in Saitama Prefecture. Japan Mint has assayed and hallmarked from 1929, and the Saitama branch moved from Tokyo in 2016. Japanese hallmarking is optional. Gold, silver and platinum are subject to assay. The articles combined with the golden parts and the platinum parts are hallmarked with special marks.

== See also ==
- Hallmark
- Silver hallmarks
