= Maker's mark (disambiguation) =

Maker's mark may refer to:

- Maker's mark, a mark identifying an object's maker or workshop
  - Silver hallmark, a stamp used on silver products
  - Mason's mark, a symbol to identify the stonemason or guild who worked on a construction project
  - Factory mark, a marking affixed by manufacturers on their productions in order to authenticate them
- Maker's Mark, an American brand of small-batch bourbon whiskey
