= British Hallmarking Council =

The British Hallmarking Council (BHC) is the organisation responsible for supervising hallmarking in the United Kingdom. It is a non-departmental public body of the Department for Business and Trade (DBT). The BHC was created under the Hallmarking Act 1973 (c. 43) to oversee the activities of the four remaining assay offices (located in London, Birmingham, Sheffield and Edinburgh). The costs of its operations are met entirely by the four offices.
