= George Unite =

English Silversmith

- Born: Birmingham, England
- Baptised: 30 July 1798
- Died: 19 October 1896
- Occupation: Silversmith

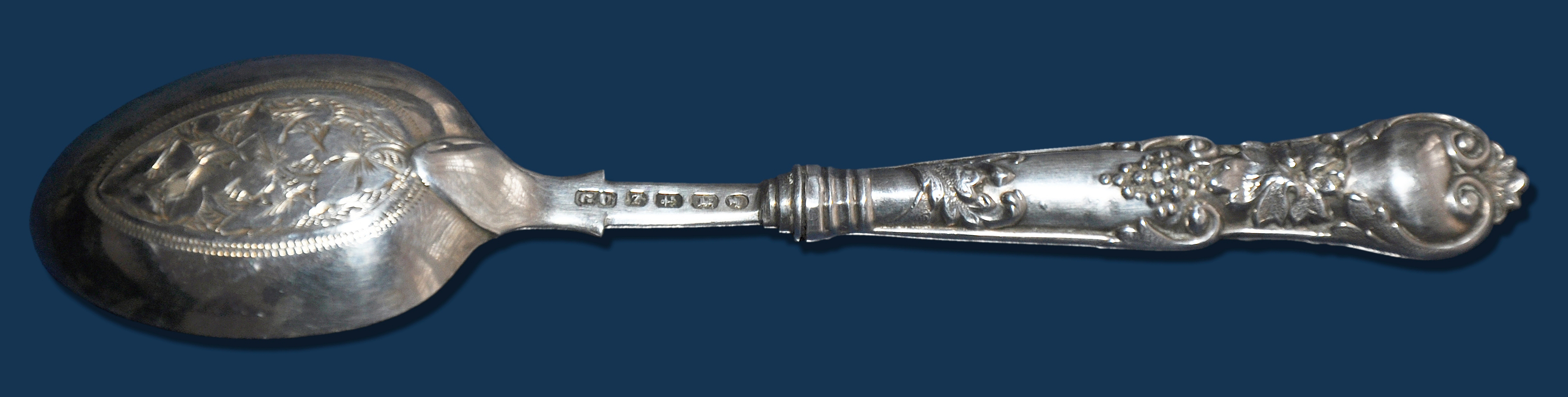
A spoon, hallmarked 1899, and carrying the "GU" mark.

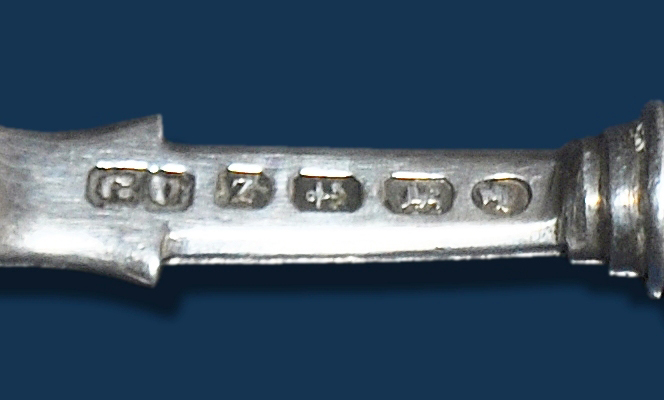
Close up of maker's mark and hallmarks

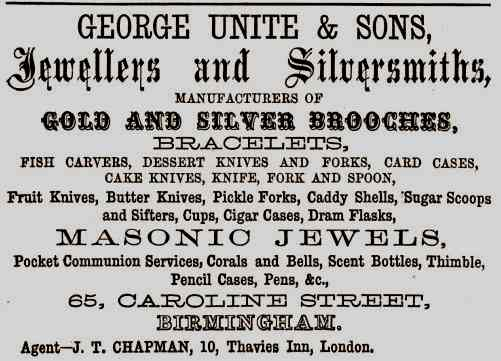
Printed advert for George Unite & Sons

George Unite (1798 – 19 October 1896) was an English silversmith working in Birmingham, England.

Unite was born in Birmingham in 1798 to Samuel and Prudence Unite. He was apprenticed to Joseph Willmore in 1810. He worked in partnership with James Hilliard from 1825, but registered his own maker's mark, "GU", with the Birmingham Assay Office on 8 August 1832, when he gave his address as 42, Caroline Street, Birmingham. The Hilliard partnership ended before 1845. and Unite continued business under his own name. By 1854, the firm was at 65 Caroline Street and had representation through agents at Thavies Inn, Holborn, London.

The business became George Unite & Sons c. 1865. Unite died in 1896 and the company merged with William Henry Lyde's electroplate company, located at 50 Newhall Hill, Birmingham, in 1928, to become George Unite Sons & Lyde Ltd.
