= Silver hallmarks =

Stamp indicating the purity of silver objects

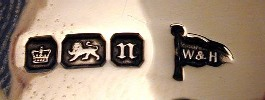
Hallmarks on British sterling. Left to right: Crown signifying city of Sheffield, lion passant, Letter n of a style dating piece to 1905, and maker's insignia for Walker & Hall.

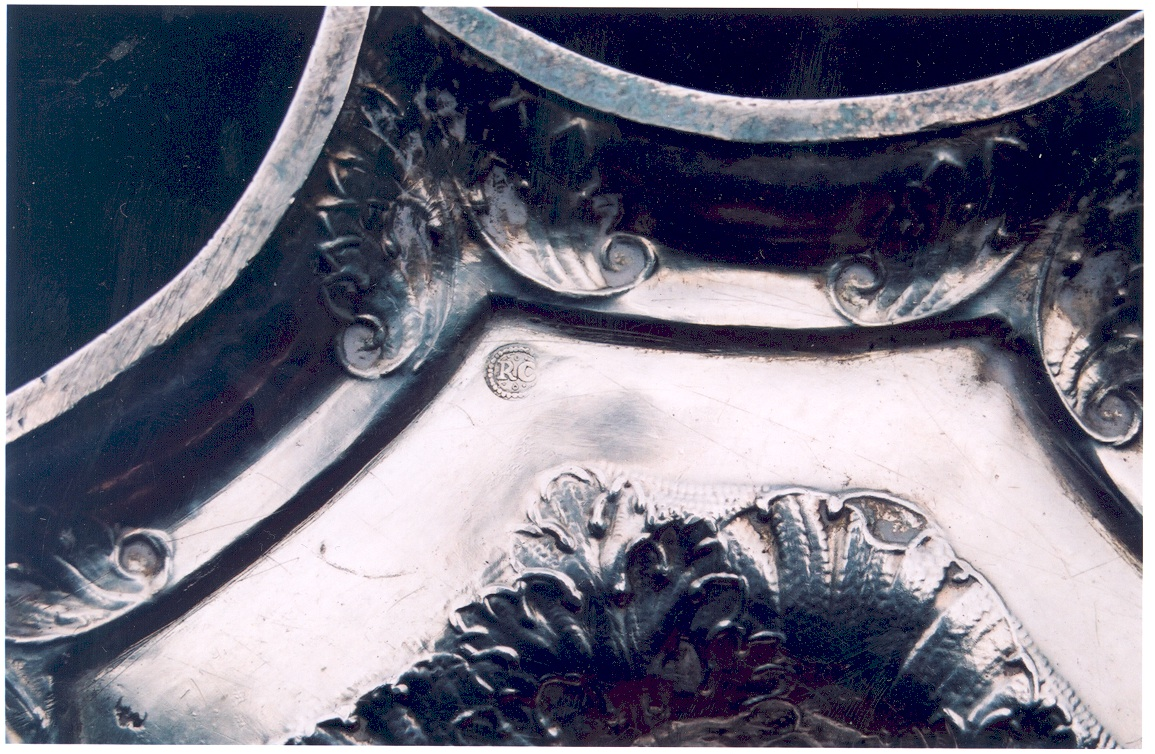
1680 maker's mark on base of a candlestick, for Robert Cooper, London

A silver object that is to be sold commercially is, in most countries, stamped with one or more silver hallmarks indicating the purity of the silver, the mark of the manufacturer or silversmith, and other (optional) markings to indicate the date of manufacture and additional information about the piece. In some countries, a national assayer's office controls the testing of silver objects and marking of purity.

Hallmarks are applied with a hammer and punch, a process that leaves sharp edges and spurs of metal. Therefore, hallmarking is generally done before the piece goes for its final polishing.

The hallmark for sterling silver varies from nation to nation, often using distinctive historical symbols, although Dutch and UK Assay offices no longer strike their traditional hallmarks exclusively in their own territories and undertake assay in other countries using marks that are the same as those used domestically.

== United Kingdom and Ireland ==
One of the most highly structured hallmarking systems in the world is that of the United Kingdom, (Scotland, England, Wales and Northern Ireland), and Ireland. These five nations have, historically, provided a wealth of information about a piece through their series of applied punches. Since 2015 visually identical UK Hallmarks have been struck in India and Italy by sub-offices of Birmingham and Sheffield Assay Offices respectively:

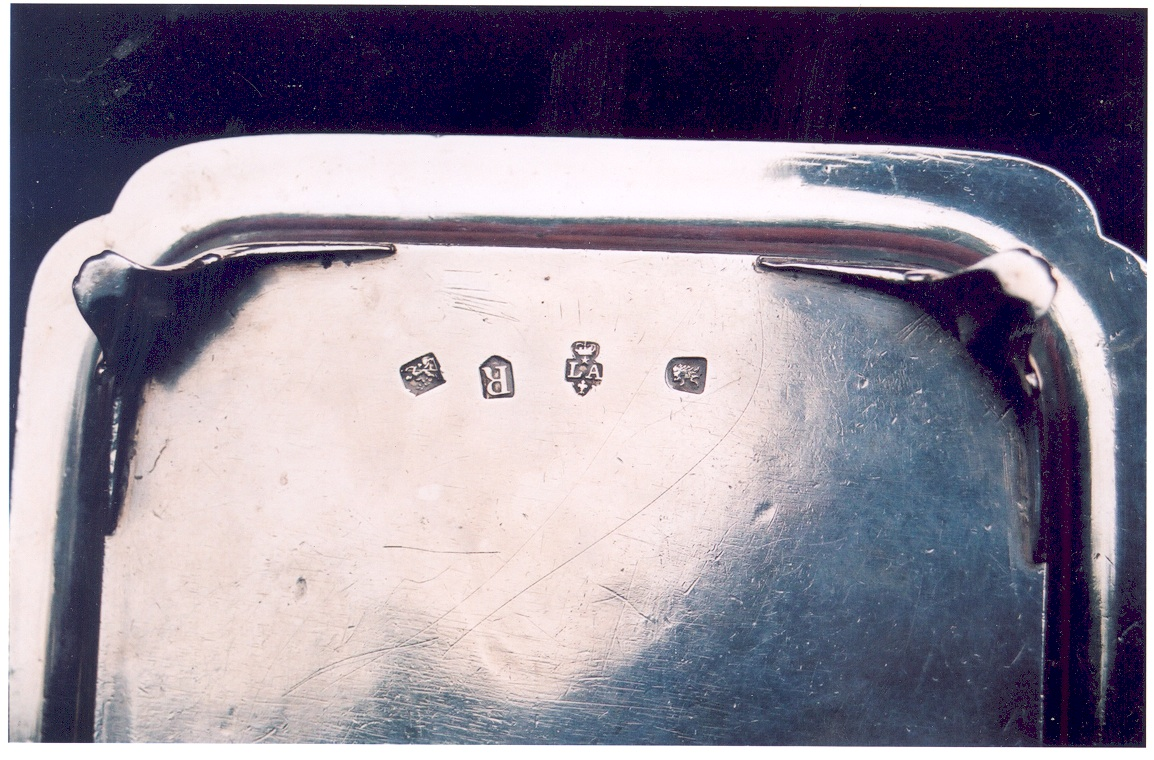
London assay office hallmarks on the back of a waiter, or small square salver. Marks indicate it is Britannia gauge silver made by (or for) Paul de Lamerie (taken to or) in London and dated 1732 (it could have been made a year or two earlier than 1732).

- A stamp indicating the purity of the silver is called the assayer's mark. The mark for silver meeting the sterling standard of purity is the Lion Passant, but there have been other variations over the years, most notably the mark indicating Britannia purity. The Britannia standard was obligatory in Britain between 1697 and 1720 to try to help prevent British sterling silver coins from being melted to make silver plate. It became an optional standard thereafter, and in the United Kingdom and Ireland is now denoted by the millesimal fineness hallmark "958", with the symbol of Britannia being applied optionally. The purity mark for Irish silver is the harp crowned.
- The date mark is a letter indicating the exact year in which the piece was made. The typeface, whether the letter is uppercase or lowercase, and even the shape inside which the letter is stamped, must all be taken together to determine the year.
- The city mark (or town mark) no longer indicates the city in which the piece was assayed, or that the item was assayed in the UK. A Legislative Reform Order (LRO) came into law on 8 February 2013 giving UK Assay Offices the legal right to strike hallmarks outside of UK territory. Since July 2016 Birmingham Assay Office have been striking Birmingham Hallmarks in Mumbai, India and there are proposals for further offshore marking centres. In March 2018 the British Hallmarking Council announced that in future, items assayed and marked offshore must be distinguishable from those assayed in the UK. An additional mark to indicate that an item was assayed outside the UK is likely to be introduced in 2018. Sheffield Assay have a sub-office in Malpensa, Italy. London and Edinburgh Assay Offices are the only two Assay offices exclusively striking hallmarks in the UK.

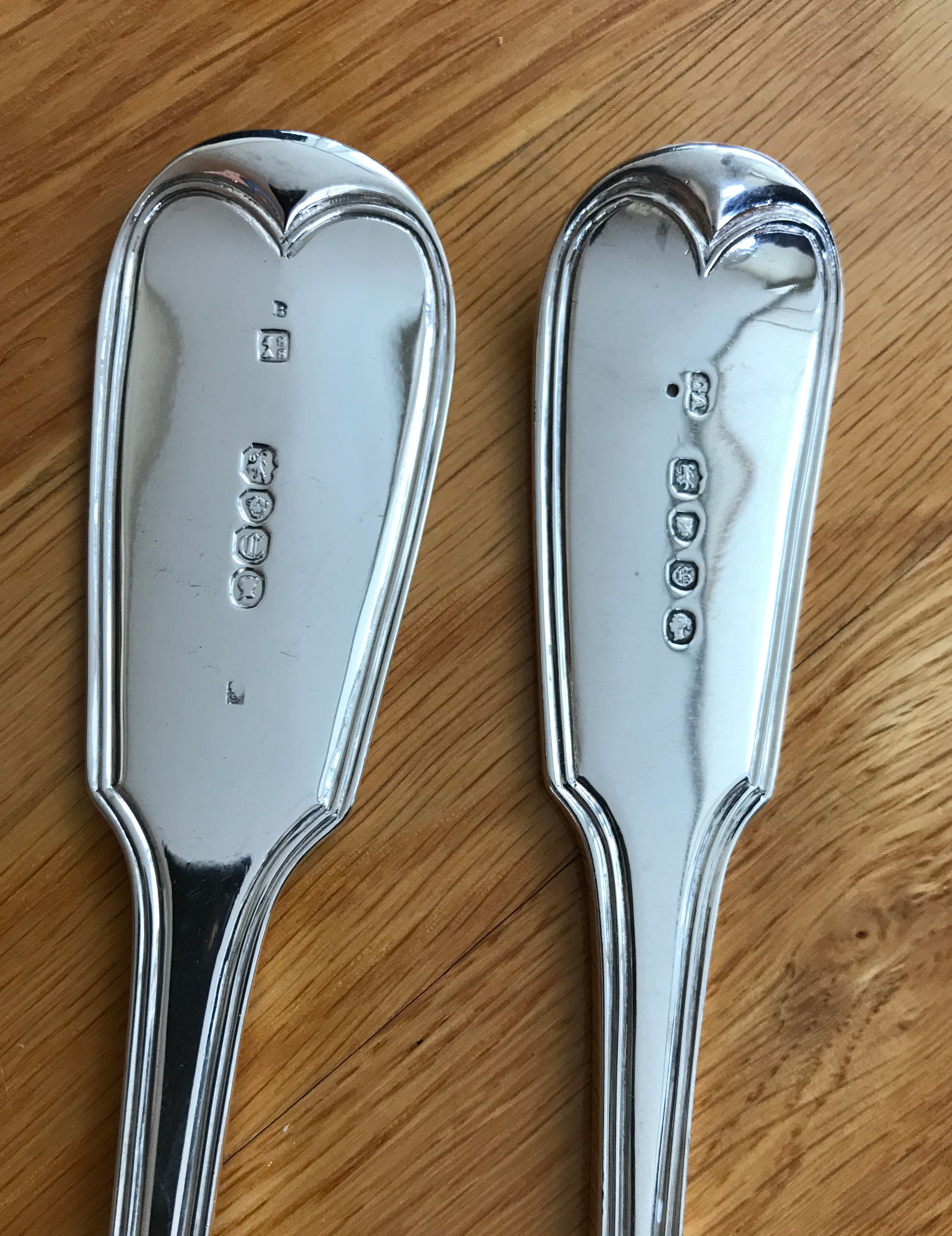
Shows the hallmarks for two pieces of English silver (from the workshops of George Adams (1842) and Joseph & Albert Savory (1838)) each with a tally mark added (the letter B on one and a small dot on the other). Both pieces also have a Duty Mark (Queen Victoria).

- Each silver maker has his or her own, unique maker's mark. This hallmark is usually a set of initials inside an escutcheon. In the modern precious-metal hallmarking, this mark might identify an entity that submitted the item for assaying (not necessarily the manufacturer), so the official term is the responsibility mark (or sponsor's mark in the UK and Ireland). The Legislative Reform Order (LRO) which came into law on 8 February 2013 also changed the requirements for sponsor marks, allowing logos to be used for the first time, as long as they provide the required traceability.
- Irish silver also contains the image of Hibernia. This mark was introduced in 1730, and is still in use today.

The series of hallmarks described above are still in use in today.

However, there are two silver hallmarks that have been discontinued:

- Beginning on 1 December 1784, British law mandated that a duty mark be applied to silver pieces. This showed that the requisite tax had been paid to the Crown. The duty mark was a profile of the head of the current reigning monarch. The mark was discontinued in 1890.
- An additional British hallmark that is no longer used is the tally mark, which was the unique mark of a journeyman finishing his apprenticeship. These marks were used as a record of the pieces made by each journeyman so that each could be given proper payment.

== France ==
Since the year 1838, the French assay mark for items made of solid silver is the head of the goddess Minerva in profile. The French have two standards for silver purity or fineness. The higher is 950 parts per thousand, or 95% silver referred to as 1st Standard. The lower grade of silver is 800 parts per thousand, or 80% silver referred to as 2nd Standard. Both standards are marked with the head of Minerva inclusive of a numeral 1 or 2 to indicate the standard.

French silver made for export carries an assay mark in the shape of the head of Mercury, along with a number to indicate the millesimal fineness: "1" for .920, "2" for .840 and "3" for .750.

French silver also is punched with the mark of the maker, by law in the shape of a lozenge, usually with the maker's initials and a symbol.

== United States ==
In the early United States, no national assaying system was adopted, although the city of Baltimore did maintain its own assay office between 1814 and 1830. Prior to the general adoption of sterling silver as the standard of purity in 1868, silver was generally obtained from the melting of coins. Since these could vary considerably in purity, from around .750 millesimal fineness to around .900, silver known as "coin silver" varies in purity. Silver at that time was sometimes marked "COIN" or "PURE COIN", but can also be without a standard mark altogether. After the adoption of the sterling standard, pieces were marked with "STERLING", the number "925" or the notation "925/1000".

The United States also had no date marking system. Because of this, some companies within the U.S., such as Tiffany, Reed & Barton and Gorham, adopted their own date marking systems.

While American manufacturers did not apply assay marks, city marks or date marks, they did apply a maker's mark. This is generally not done today. The old hallmarks were as unique as today's logos, and disputes often arose when one company copied another's stamp.

"The words "silver" and "sterling silver" describe a product that contains 92.5% pure silver. Silver products sometimes may be marked 925, which means that 925 parts per thousand are pure silver. Some jewellery described as "silver plate" has a layer of silver applied to a base metal. "Coin silver" is used for compounds that contain 90% pure silver. According to the law, quality-marked silver also must bear the name or a U.S. registered trademark of the company or person that will stand behind the mark."

== Hungary ==
Between 1867 and 1933, Austria-Hungary and later, Hungary used the crescent moon crowned head of ancient Greek heroine Diana as the hallmarking symbol of legal silver alloys. The head was encircled by a frame, optionally composed of convex, concave and straight lines. One concave line represented 140/1000 fineness, a straight one 150 and a convex one 160. For example, a Diana head within a frame made in the shape of a 5-petal flower represented 5×160/1000 = 800 thousands fineness, a local silver standard commonly used in table forks and spoons. Meanwhile, a hexagonal frame represented 900 fine silver. This same system was also used to frame gold hallmarks.

== Japan ==
From 1929, Japan Mint assays and hallmarks the articles made of silver. The hallmarks of Japan Mint have the figure of the national flag of Japan.

== Sources ==
- John Bly: Discovering Hallmarks on English Silver, Shire Publications Ltd., seventh edition 1986, Aylesbury, Bucks ISBN 0-85263-796-9
- Cinamon, Diana Sanders (2007). All About Antique Silver with International Hallmarks. San Bernardino, CA: AAA Publishing. ISBN 978-0-9785168-0-2.
- Venable, Charles L. (1997). Silver in America, 1840 – 1940: A Century of Splendor (third ed.). New York, NY.: Harry N. Abrams.
- Hood, William P. Jr. (1999). Tiffany Silver Flatware, 1845 – 1905: When Dining Was an Art. Suffolk, England.: Antique Collectors Club.
- Rainwater, Dorothy T.; Redfield, Judy (1998). The Encyclopedia of American Silver Manufacturers (fourth ed.). Atglen, PA: Schiffer Publishing.
- Wyler, Seymour B. (1937). The Book of Old Silver, English – American – Foreign, With All Available Hallmarks Including Sheffield Plate Marks. New York, NY: Crown Publishers.
- International Hallmarks on Silver Collected by Tardy (reprint ed.). 2000.
- Hallmarking Convention. "Glossary".
- Goldsmiths' Company Assay Office. "What is a Hallmark?".
