= Ed Butler (British Army officer) =

British Army officer

Brigadier Ed Butler CBE DSO
- Born: 27 February 1962 (age 64)
- Relatives: Sir Adam Butler (father); Rab Butler, Baron Butler of Saffron Walden (grandfather)
- Military career
- Allegiance: United Kingdom
- Branch: British Army
- Service years: 1984–2008
- Rank: Brigadier
- Service number: 520039
- Unit: Royal Green Jackets
- Commands: Task Force Helmand (2006); 16 Air Assault Brigade (2004–06); 22 Special Air Service (2001–02)
- Conflicts: The Troubles; Bosnian War; Sierra Leone Civil War; War in Afghanistan
- Awards: Commander of the Order of the British Empire; Distinguished Service Order; Mentioned in Despatches; Queen's Commendation for Valuable Service (2)
- Other work: Prime Warden Goldsmith

Brigadier Edward Adam Butler, CBE, DSO (born 27 February 1962) is a former British Army officer who commanded Task Force Helmand, and serves as Prime Warden Goldsmith for 2025/26.

== Early life ==
The younger son of Sir Adam Butler and Felicity Molesworth-St Aubyn, his grandfather was the prominent Conservative politician Rab Butler (later Lord Butler of Saffron Walden).

Butler was educated at Eton College, before going up to read Politics and International Relations at the University of Exeter (graduating Bachelor of Arts in 1983). He later pursued postgraduate studies at Cranfield University (taking a Master of Arts in 2003).

== Military career ==
Butler was commissioned into the Royal Green Jackets in August 1984. He was mentioned in despatches while on active service in Northern Ireland in November 1991, and twice received the Queen's Commendation for Valuable Service; first for his service in the former Republic of Yugoslavia in 1997 and again for his service in Sierra Leone in 2000.

Butler was awarded the Distinguished Service Order for his actions in Afghanistan as the commanding officer of 22 Special Air Service during 2001 and 2002. He became commander of 16 Air Assault Brigade in 2004, in which role he was deployed as commander of Task Force Helmand in April 2006. He went on to be Chief, Joint Force Operations at Permanent Joint Headquarters in December 2006 before retiring in December 2008, citing family reasons.

== Corporate career ==
After leaving the British Army Butler became Chief Executive of Corporates for Crisis (2008–11), a business providing advice for companies operating in difficult places, and then Chairman of and latterly Senior Advisor to S-RM, an intelligence and risk consulting business. In July 2019 he was interviewed for a BBC Radio 4 Analysis programme, as Head of Risk Analysis (Chief Resilience Officer) at Pool Re, working there until 2022. Since 2016 Butler has served as a Senior Independent Advisor to EDF Energy Nuclear Generation, and as a Senior Advisor to reinsurance brokers Northcourt Ltd and Gallos Technologies since 2022.

== Personal life ==
Butler and his wife, Sophie, have two children.

His family descends in the male line from Sir Philip Butler (1489–1545), progenitor of the Barons Boteler.

== Honours and arms ==
Brigadier Butler has received numerous honours, decorations and appointments, including:

- CBE: Commander of the Most Excellent Order of the British Empire (2006)
  - MBE (1997)
- DSO: Companion of the Distinguished Service Order (2002)
  - Freeman of the City of London
  - Prime Warden of the Worshipful Company of Goldsmiths

Coat of arms of Brigadier Ed Butler
Crest A Falcon rising belled and jessed the dexter leg resting on a Covered Cup all Or Escutcheon Gules on a Chevron cottised between three Covered Cups all Or a Cross couped Azure Motto Audentior Orders Surrounding the Shield the circlet of the Order of the British Empire Other elements As Prime Warden Goldsmith, Brigadier Butler can impale the Goldsmiths' arms (dexter) with those of his family (sinister) Other versions Arms of his grandfather, the Lord Butler of Saffron Walden KG

== See also ==
- Worshipful Company of Goldsmiths
