= SP Technical Research Institute of Sweden =

Swedish joint stock company

The SP Technical Research Institute of Sweden (Swedish: SP Sveriges Tekniska Forskningsinstitut), is a joint stock company, fully owned by the Swedish government. It was formerly known as the National Swedish Authority for Testing, Inspection and Metrology (Swedish: Statens Provningsanstalt, SP), thus the abbreviation SP. The company has its headquarters in Borås and employs 1,000 persons.

Business areas include, among other things, applied research, technical studies and investigations, quality assurances, standardization and certification.
