= Sheffield Assay Office =

Assay office in the United Kingdom

Coordinates: 53°24′26.8″N 1°29′44.7″W

The Sheffield Assay Office is one of the four remaining assay offices in the United Kingdom, the other three being in London, Birmingham, and Edinburgh.

== History ==
In 1773, Sheffield's silversmiths joined with those of Birmingham to petition Parliament for the establishment of assay offices in their respective cities. An act of Parliament, the Plate Assay (Sheffield and Birmingham) Act 1772 (13 Geo. 3. c. 52), was passed in March, just one month after the original petition was presented to Parliament, to allow Birmingham and Sheffield the right to assay silver.

The assay office marks for London, Birmingham, Sheffield, and Edinburgh. The third from the left shows the rose for Sheffield.

The Assay Office was then founded and hallmarked its first piece on 20 September 1773. Lots were drawn to determine which marks the offices would use. Sheffield won and chose the crown, while Birmingham took the anchor. Originally, only silver produced within twenty miles of Sheffield could be marked at the office. From 1784, Sheffield was empowered to keep a register of all maker's marks within one hundred miles, including those of Birmingham.

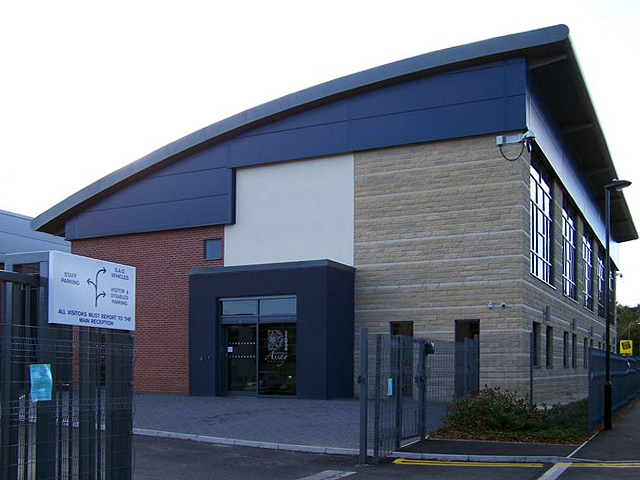
Sheffield Assay Office, October 2008

In 1795, after several moves, an office was established on Fargate. In 1880 it moved to Leopold Street, and in 1958 to Portobello Street. In May 2007 it was announced that the office would move to a new purpose-built site on Beulah Road in Owlerton, where is it now based.

In 1977, Sheffield's mark was changed to the White Rose of York, and it became the last office to standardise its date letters.
