= Birmingham Assay Office =

One of the four assay offices in the United Kingdom

Birmingham Assay Office (Since 2015)
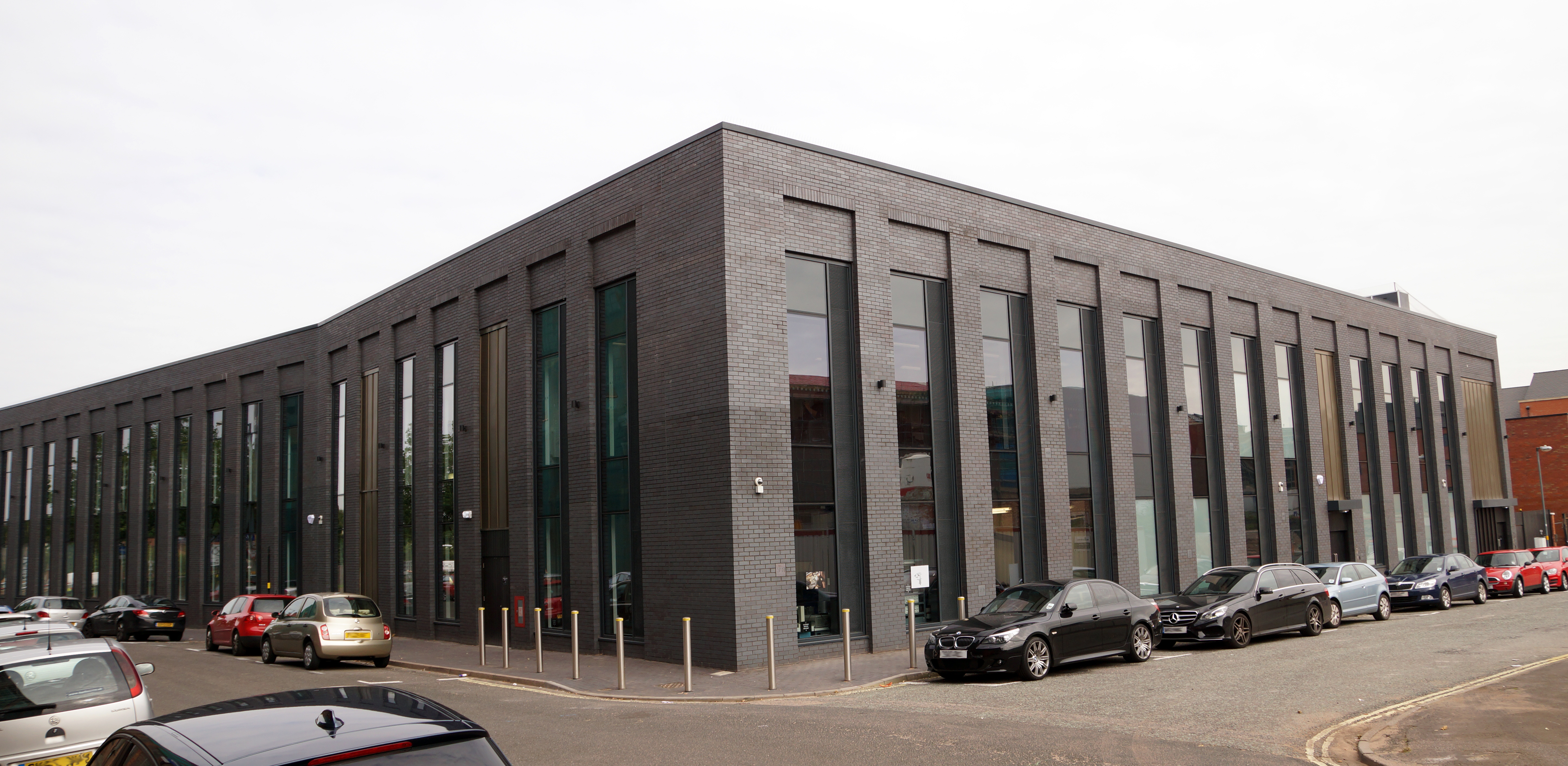
- Interactive map of the Birmingham Assay Office (Since 2015) area

General information
- Type: Assay Office
- Location: 1 Moreton Street, Birmingham, England
- Coordinates: 52.4864°N 1.9176°W
- Completed: 2015
- Opened: 27 July 2015

Website
- https://www.theassayoffice.co.uk/

The Birmingham Assay Office, one of the four assay offices in the United Kingdom, is located in the Jewellery Quarter, Birmingham. The development of a silver industry in 18th century Birmingham was hampered by the legal requirement that items of solid silver be assayed, and the nearest Assay Offices were in Chester and London. Matthew Boulton and Birmingham's other great industrialists joined forces with silversmiths of Sheffield to petition Parliament for the establishment of assay offices in their respective cities. In spite of determined opposition by London silversmiths, an act of Parliament, the Plate Assay (Sheffield and Birmingham) Act 1772 (13 Geo. 3. c. 52), was passed in March 1773, just one month after the original petition was presented to Parliament, to allow Birmingham and Sheffield the right to assay silver. The Birmingham Assay Office opened on 31 August 1773 and initially operated from three rooms in the King's Head Inn on New Street employing only four staff and was only operating on a Tuesday. The first customer on that day was Matthew Boulton.

The Birmingham Assay Office is managed by a board of 36 "Guardians of the Standard of Wrought Plate in Birmingham", between six and nine of whom must be connected with the trade.

The assay office marks for London, Birmingham, Sheffield, and Edinburgh. The second from the left shows the anchor for Birmingham. The anchor mark no longer indicates that an item was assayed in Birmingham. In July 2016 Birmingham Assay Office began striking its hallmark via a subsidiary in Mumbai, India. In 2018 the British Hallmarking Council announced that hallmarks struck overseas must be different from domestic hallmarks. Beginning in early 2019 a modified version of the Birmingham mark has been adopted for use in India. Offshore hallmark used by Indian subsidiary of Assay Office Birmingham.

The hallmark of the Birmingham Assay Office is the Anchor, and that of the Sheffield Assay Office was the Crown. A story about the origins of this hallmark goes that meetings prior to the inauguration of both Birmingham and Sheffield assay offices in 1773 were held at a public house called the Crown and Anchor Tavern on the Strand, London. It is said that the choice of symbol was made on the toss of a coin which resulted in Birmingham adopting the Anchor and Sheffield the Crown (which was changed in 1977 to the White Rose of York).

Services provided by the office include Hallmarking, Nickel Testing, Metal Analysis, Plating Thickness determination, Bullion Certification, consultancy and Gem Certification. A full list of products and services can be found here, on their website.

== Location ==
Birmingham Assay Office (1877–2015)
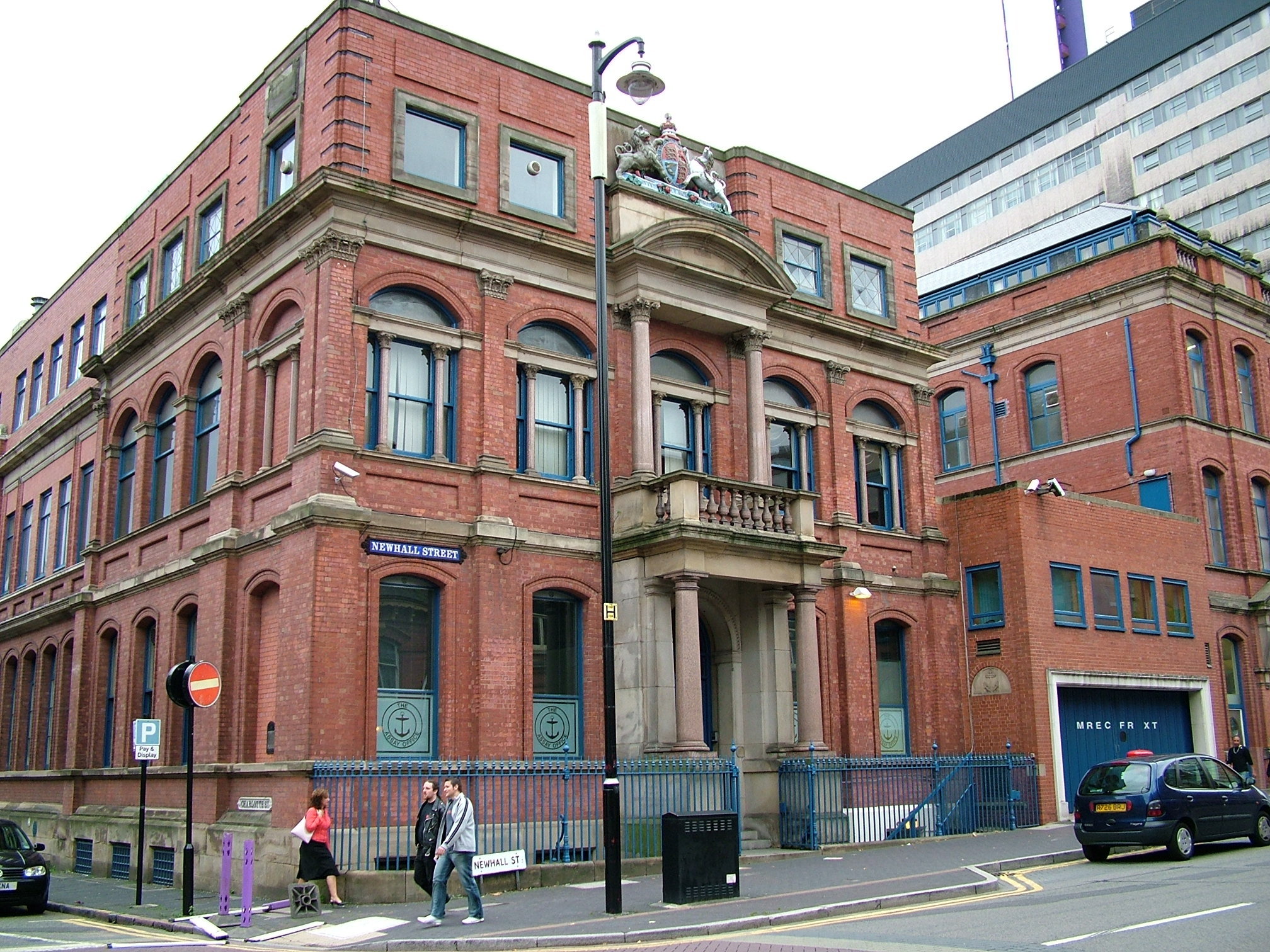
- Interactive map of the Birmingham Assay Office (1877–2015) area

General information
- Type: Assay Office
- Architectural style: Victorian Italianate
- Location: Newhall Street, Birmingham, England
- Coordinates: 52°29′02″N 1°54′22″W
- Completed: 1877 (Phipson), 1890, 1899, 1907, 1914 (Ewen Harper, architect), 1974
- Relocated: 27 July 2015
- Owner: TCN UK

Design and construction
- Architect: Andrew Phipson

Listed Building – Grade II
- Designated: 25 September 1972
- Reference no.: 1076142

The Assay Office started in 1773 at leased rooms in the Kings Head Inn on New Street. It moved to Bull Lane in 1782, to Little Colmore Street in 1799 and then to Little Cannon Street in 1815 until its purpose-built site on Newhall Street (52.4839°N 1.9062°W) was built in 1877, where it became the largest assay office in Europe, hallmarking 13 million articles in 2003 and claiming to be the largest in the world. The Newhall Street building is listed as Grade II. In 2016, the Assay Office relocated to its new premises at 1 Moreton Street, Birmingham.

== 2015 relocation ==
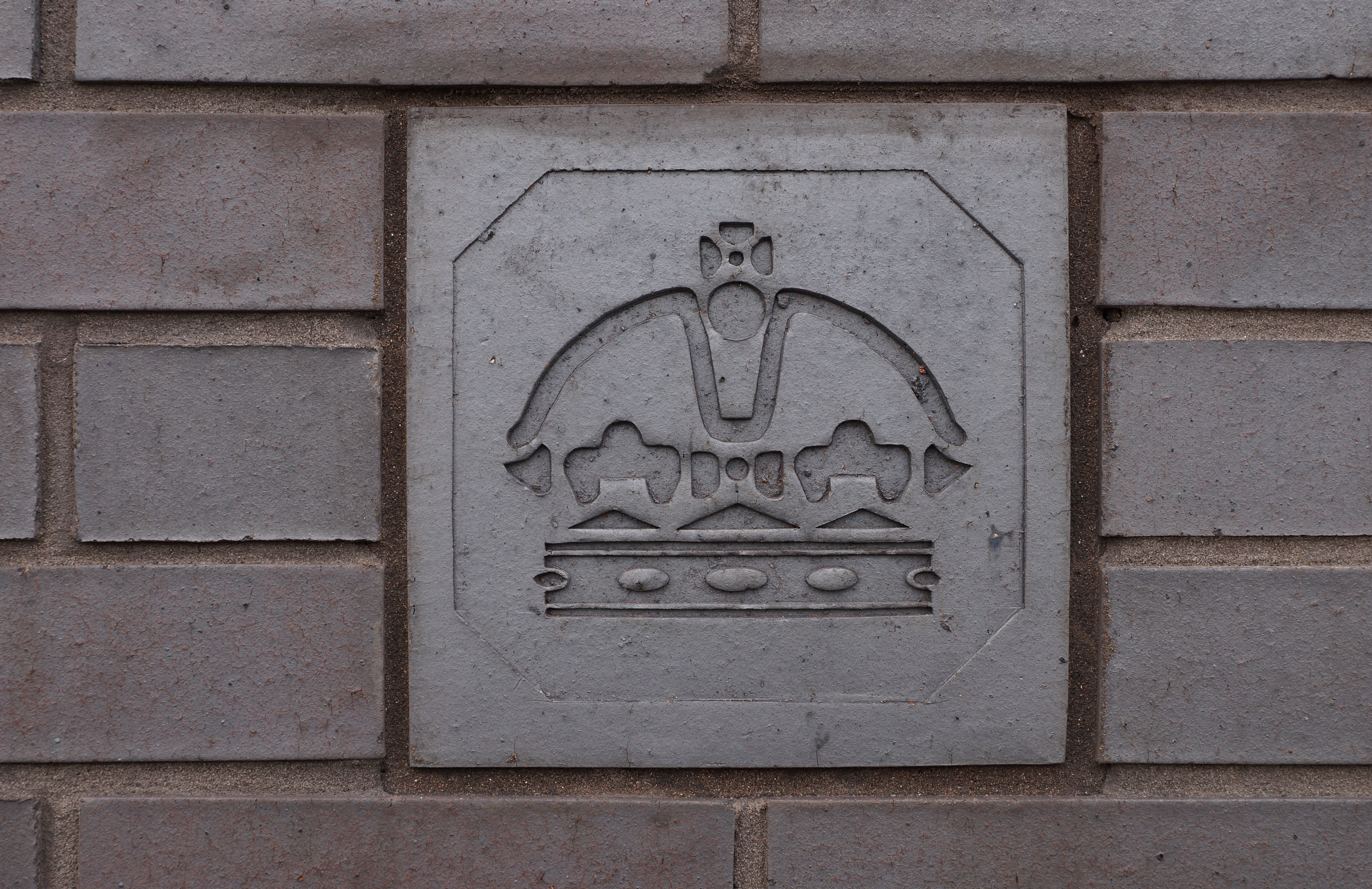
One of the "hallmark" bricks

Due to lack of capacity in its Newhall Street building, it was decided that a new Assay Office would be needed. A site on the western edge of the Jewellery Quarter was chosen and planning permission was secured in December 2012, and construction started in May 2014, for a scheduled completion in 2015. The construction was project managed by Trebor Developments with Galliford Try as principal contractor, O'Brien as sub-contractors and Glazzard Architects as architects.

The new building cost £10 million to construct. This 5,000 sq ft two-storey blue brick building on Moreton Street (52.4864°N 1.9176°W) provides modern offices, laboratories and conference facilities. The Assay Office moved into the new building on 27 July 2015.

The design of the new building incorporates special "feature bricks" which bear the key hallmarking symbols used during the Assay Office's 240-year history. These include the traditional hallmarking symbols; a lion for Sterling Silver, crown for Gold, orb for Platinum and Pallas Athene for Palladium. The Birmingham town mark, the anchor, also features prominently.

There are also a dozen which feature the sponsors' marks of some of its most significant customers. In recognition of the honour, these customers contributed £12,000 to charity. The full list of companies featured is: Thomas Fattorini, R. Platnauer, Toye, Kenning & Spencer, Cooksongold, Deakin & Francis, BJA (British Jewellers' Association, now National Association of Jewellers), F. Hinds, Charles Green, Hockley Mint, Weston Beamor, Jewellery Brokers and Martyn Pugh.

The building includes a private museum, known as the Silver Collection. The former building on Newhall Street was converted into the "Assay Studios" a creative office space and innovation hub in November 2016.
