= Hallmark =

Official stamp on metal items

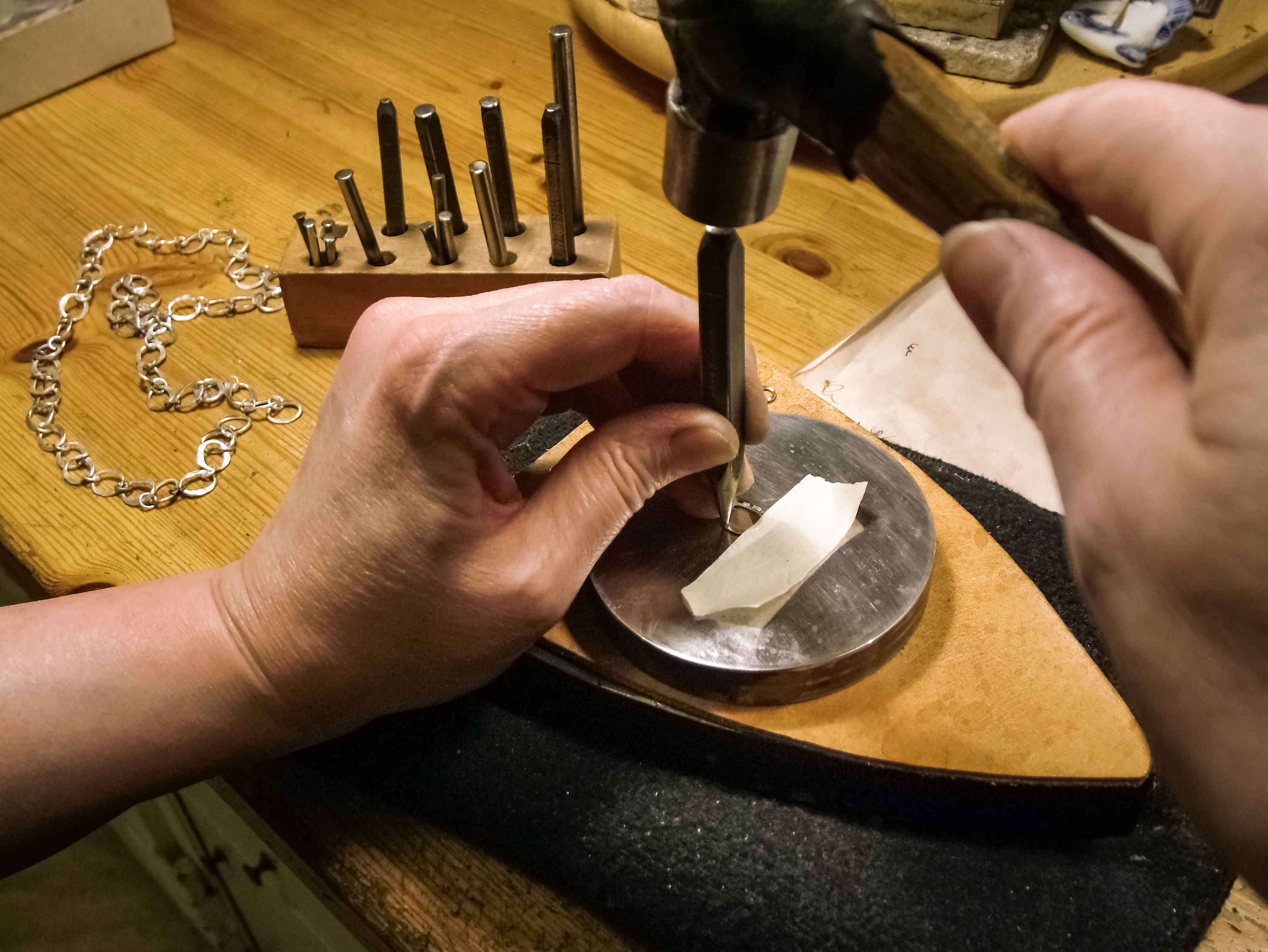
A hallmark is punched into a section of a silver chain by a silversmith.

A hallmark is an official mark or series of marks struck on items made of metal, mostly to certify the content of noble metals—such as platinum, gold, silver and in some nations, palladium. In a more general sense, the term hallmark is used to refer to any standard of quality. It is not to be confused with responsibility marks, which indicate the maker.

== General overview ==
Historically, hallmarks were applied by a trusted party: the "guardians of the craft" or, more recently, by an assay office (assay mark). Hallmarks are a guarantee of certain purity or fineness of the metal, as determined by official metal (assay) testing. Hallmarks include information not only about the precious metal and fineness, but the country from which the item was tested and marked. Some hallmarks can reveal even more information, e.g. the assay office, size of the object marked, year the item was hallmarked - referred to as a date mark (also known as date letter).

=== Distinguishment ===
Hallmarks are often confused with "trademarks" or "maker's marks". A hallmark is not the mark of a manufacturer to distinguish their products from other manufacturers' products: that is the function of trademarks or makers' marks. To be a true hallmark, it must be the guarantee of an independent body or authority that the contents are as marked. Thus, a stamp of "925" by itself is not, strictly speaking, a hallmark, but is rather an unattested fineness mark, generally stamped by the maker.

=== Prerequisites to hallmarking ===
Many nations require, as a prerequisite to official hallmarking, that the maker or sponsor itself marks upon the item a responsibility mark and a claim of fineness. Responsibility marks are also required in the US if metal fineness is claimed, even though there is no official hallmarking scheme there. Nevertheless, in nations with an official hallmarking scheme, the hallmark is only applied after the item has been assayed by an independent party to determine that its purity conforms not only to the standards set down by the law but also with the maker's claims as to metal content.

=== Systems ===
In some nations, such as the UK, the hallmark is made up of several elements, including: a mark denoting the type of metal, the maker/sponsor's mark and the year of the marking. In England, the year of marking commences on 19 May, the feast day of Saint Dunstan, patron saint of gold- and silversmiths. In other nations, such as Poland, the hallmark is a single mark indicating metal and fineness, augmented by a responsibility mark (known as a sponsor's mark in the UK). Within a group of nations that are signatories to an international convention known as the Vienna Convention on the Control of the Fineness and the Hallmarking of Precious Metal Objects, additional, optional yet official, marks may also be struck by the assay office. These can ease import obligations among and between the signatory states. Signatory countries each have a single representative hallmark, which would be struck next to the Convention mark that represents the metal and fineness.

=== Pseudo-hallmarks ===
A pseudo-hallmark is a mark that is similar to hallmark, commonly punched to metals similar to silver, such as Pewter, for visual appeal for rare metals.

== History ==
=== Ancient Byzantine hallmarks ===
The control or inspection of precious metals was an ancient concept of examination and marking, by means of inspection stamps (punch marks). The use of hallmarks, at first on silver, has a long history dating back to the 4th century AD—there is evidence of silver bars marked under authority of the Flavius Julius Constans around AD 350—and represents the oldest known form of consumer protection. A series or system of five marks has been found on Byzantine silver dating from this period, though their interpretation is still not completely resolved.

=== Late Middle Ages ===
From the Late Middle Ages, hallmarking was administered by local governments through authorized assayers. These assayers examined precious metal objects, under the auspices of the state, before the object could be offered for public sale. By the age of the craft guilds, the authorized examiner's mark was the "master's mark", which consisted frequently of his initials and/or the coat of arms of the goldsmith or silversmith. At one time, there was no distinction between silversmiths and goldsmiths, who were all referred to as orfèvres, the French word for goldsmith. The master craftsman was responsible for the quality of the work that left his atelier or workshop, regardless of who made the item. Hence the responsibility mark is still known today in French as le poinçon de maître literally "the maker's punch". In this period, fineness was more or less standardized in the major European nations (writ: France and England) at 20 karats for gold and 12 to 13 lots (75% to 81%) for silver, but the standards could only be partly enforced, owing to the lack of precise analytical tools and techniques.

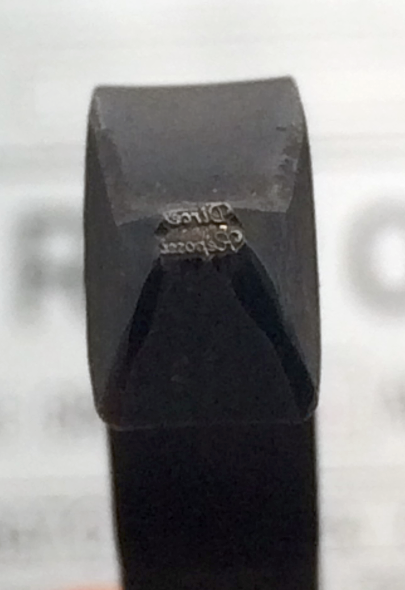
Jewelry hallmark: Dirce Repossi

==== France ====
Hallmarking is Europe's earliest form of consumer protection. Modern hallmarking in Europe appears first in France, with the Goldsmiths Statute of 1260 promulgated under Étienne Boileau, Provost of Paris, for King Louis IX. A standard for silver was thus established. In 1275, King Philip III prescribed, by royal decree, the mark for use on silver works, along with specific punches for each community's smiths. In 1313, his successor, Philippe IV "the Fair" expanded the use of hallmarks to gold works.

==== England ====
In 1300, King Edward I of England enacted a statute requiring that all silver articles must meet the sterling silver standard (92.5% pure silver) and must be assayed in this regard by 'guardians of the craft' who would then mark the item with a leopard's head. In 1327 King Edward III of England granted a charter to the Worshipful Company of Goldsmiths (more commonly known as the Goldsmiths' Company), marking the beginning of the company's formal existence. This entity was headquartered in London at Goldsmiths' Hall, from whence the English term "hallmark" is derived. (In the UK the use of the term "hallmark" was first recorded in this sense in 1721 and in the more general sense as a "mark of quality" in 1864.)

==== Switzerland ====
In 1424, the French cardinal Jean de Brogny, after consulting a council of eight Master Goldsmiths from Geneva, enacted a regulation on the purity and hallmarking of silver objects (following the French standards) for application in Geneva. Although gold was used for articles, the regulation was silent on standards and hallmarking for gold. In Switzerland today, only precious metal watch cases must be hallmarked. The hallmarking of other items including silverware and jewelry is optional.

=== Augmentations in France and England ===
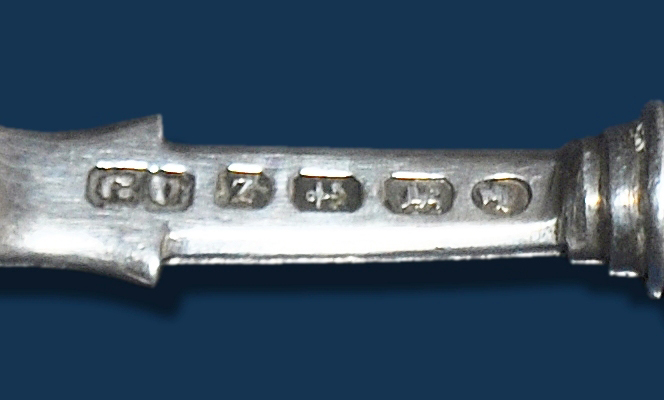
A set of hallmarks on an English silver spoon. From left to right, the maker's mark of George Unite, the date letter (1889), the Birmingham Assay Office mark, the lion passant and the monarch's head tax-mark

- In 1355, individual maker marks were introduced in France. This concept was later mirrored in England in 1363, adding accountability to the two systems.
- In 1427, the date letter system was established in France, allowing the accurate dating of any hallmarked piece.
- In 1478, the Assay Office was established in Goldsmiths' Hall. At this time, the date letter system was introduced in England. This was originally intended to be the mark of an official known as the Assay Master, who was sworn in every May. After being sworn in, the letter would advance to the next in the alphabet, regardless of whether the same individual continued to hold the post, so it came to be regarded simply as a date letter.
- In 1544 a lion passant was added to English marks, to bring the number up to four.
- In 1697, a higher standard of silver, known as the Britannia standard (95.83%, i.e. 23/24 silver) was made compulsory in Great Britain to protect the new coinage which was being melted down by silversmiths for the silver. The Sterling standard (92.5%) was restored in 1720.
- In 1784, the United Kingdom began charging a tax on silverware, and a further mark was added to indicate this had been paid. The mark was the monarch's head and continued to be used until 1890, when the tax was abolished.

== Modern hallmarks ==
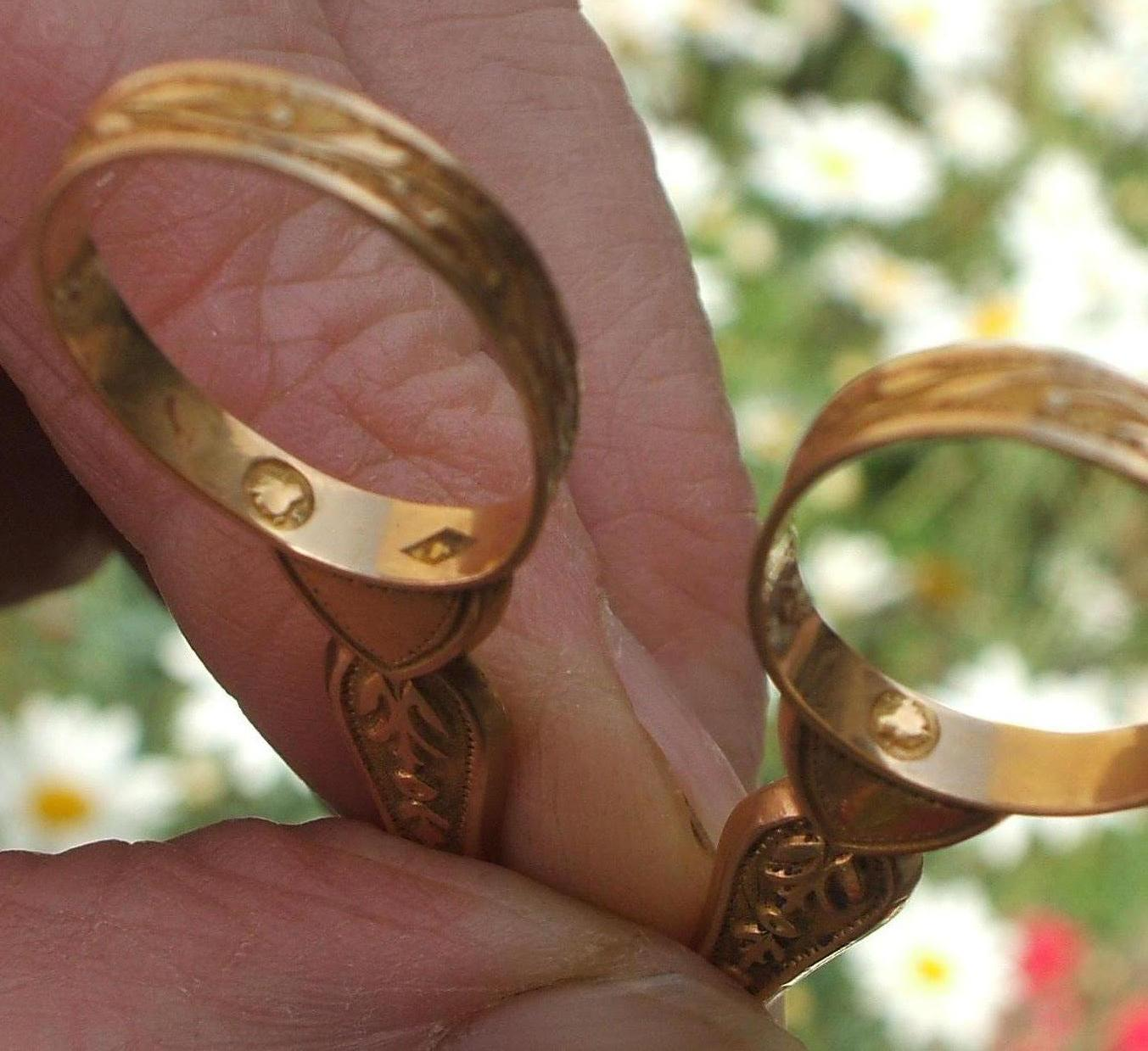
Hallmark for gold

In the modern world, in an attempt at standardizing the legislation on the inspection of precious metals and to facilitate international trade, in November 1972 a core group of European nations signed the Vienna Convention on the Control of the Fineness and the Hallmarking of Precious Metal Objects. Articles which are assayed and found by the qualifying office of a signatory country to conform to the standard, receive a mark, known as the Common Control Mark (CCM), attesting to the material's fineness. The multi-tiered motif of the CCM is the balance scales, superimposed, for gold, on two intersecting circles; for platinum, a diamond shape and for silver a mark in the shape of the Latin letter "M".

This mark is recognized in all the other contracting states, including: Austria, Cyprus, the Czech Republic, Denmark, Finland, Great Britain, Hungary, Ireland, Israel, Latvia, Lithuania, the Netherlands, Norway, Poland, Portugal, Sweden, Switzerland and Ukraine (see links below). Other nations monitor the activities of the convention and may apply for membership.

Complete international hallmarking has been plagued by difficulties, because even amongst countries which have implemented hallmarking, standards and enforcement vary considerably, making it difficult for one country to accept another's hallmarking as equivalent to its own. While some countries permit a variance from the marked fineness of up to 10 parts per thousand, others do not permit any variance (known as negative tolerance) at all. Many nations abide by the Vienna system and procedures are in place to allow additional nations to join the Vienna Convention. Similarly, with the consent of all the current member states, the terms of the convention may be amended.

The most significant item currently up for debate is the recognition of palladium as a precious metal. Some member nations recognize palladium as a precious metal while others do not.

=== Poland ===
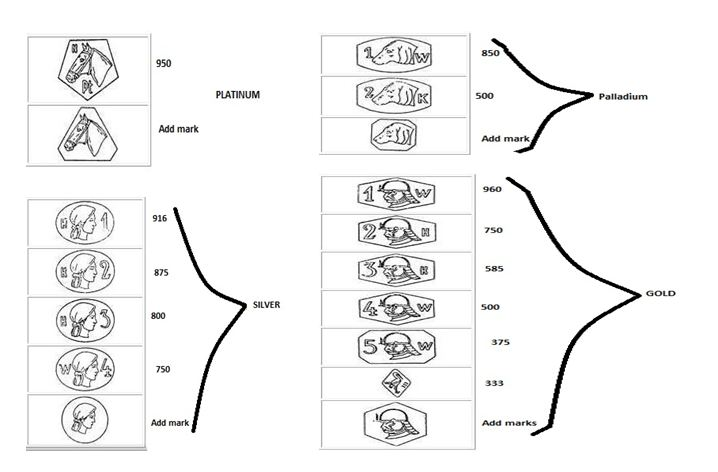
The Polish hallmarks 1963–1986

Hallmarks for gold, palladium, platinum and silver from Poland. Official Polish hallmarks between 1963 and 1986

=== France ===
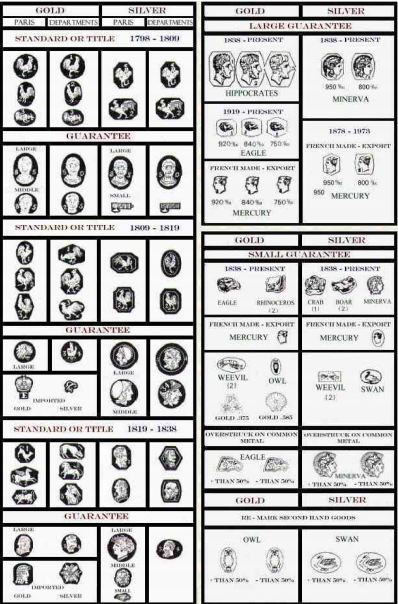
The French hallmarks 1798–1972

Official French Hallmarks used between 1798 and 1972 for gold and silver.

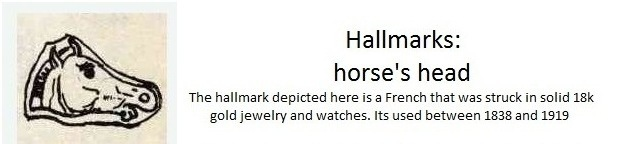
The French hallmarks 1838–1919 not official

French mark head of horse for jewellery and watches from 18k gold made in the French provinces between 1838 and 1919

=== United Kingdom ===
The assay office marks – from left to right, the leopard's head of London, the anchor of Birmingham, the Yorkshire rose of Sheffield, and the castle of Edinburgh. The assay office marks are no longer an indicator that an item was assayed in the city, or in the UK.

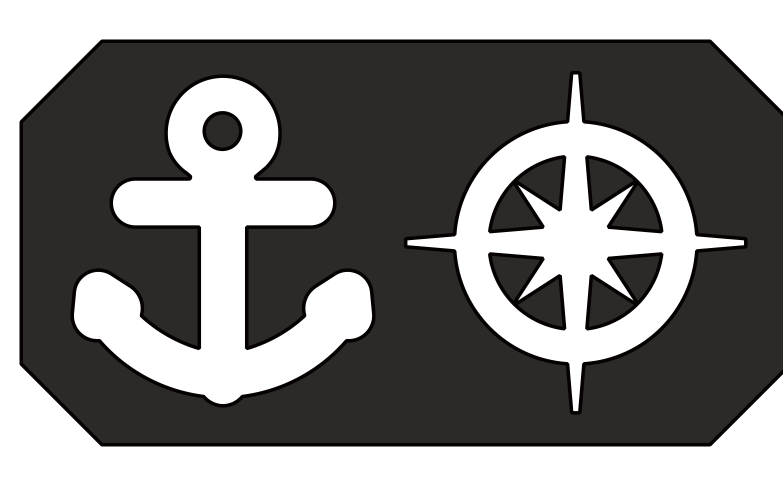
Offshore hallmark used by Birmingham Assay Office's subsidiary in India. Precious metal objects assayed and marked outside of the UK must carry a mark which distinguishes them from items assayed in the UK.

The Hallmarking Act 1973 (c. 43) made Britain a member of the Vienna Convention as well as introducing marking for platinum, a recognised metal under the convention. All four remaining assay offices finally adopted the same date letter sequences. In 1999 changes were made to the UK hallmarking system to bring the system closer into line with the European Union. Note that under this latest enactment, the date letter is no longer a compulsory part of the hallmark.

A legislative reform order (LRO) came into effect on 8 February 2013 giving UK assay offices the legal right to strike hallmarks outside of UK territory. In July 2016 Birmingham Assay Office began striking Birmingham hallmarks in Mumbai, India and further offshore offices are likely to be established. In March 2018 the British Hallmarking Council announced that UK assay office marks struck offshore must be distinguishable from those struck in the UK. It is likely that an 'offshore' assay mark will have to be added to signify that the item was not assayed in the UK. Only London and Edinburgh assay offices now strike marks exclusively in the UK.

As it now stands, the compulsory part of the UK hallmark consists of the sponsor or maker's mark, the assay office mark, and the standard of fineness (in this case silver, 925 parts in 1,000).

Examples of British hallmarks for 925 silver

These are shown in the top of the two example hallmarks. The bottom example shows the extra marks that can also be struck, the lion passant, indicating Sterling silver, the date mark (lowercase a for the year 2000), and in this example, the 'Millennium mark', which was only available for the years 1999 and 2000. The bottom example bears the Yorkshire rose mark for the Sheffield Assay Office.

The Hallmarking Act was amended in July 2009 to include palladium from January 2010.

=== Switzerland ===
Although hallmarking in the Swiss territories dates back to Geneva in the fifteenth century, there was no uniform system of hallmarking in Switzerland until 1881. Before that time, hallmarking was undertaken at the local level by the Swiss cantons. With the introduction of Federal hallmarking laws starting in 1881, increased uniformity was established.

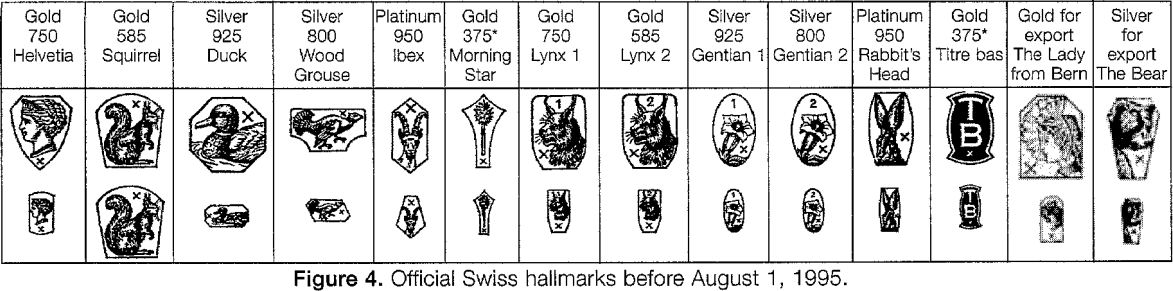
The Swiss hallmarks used on the watch cases

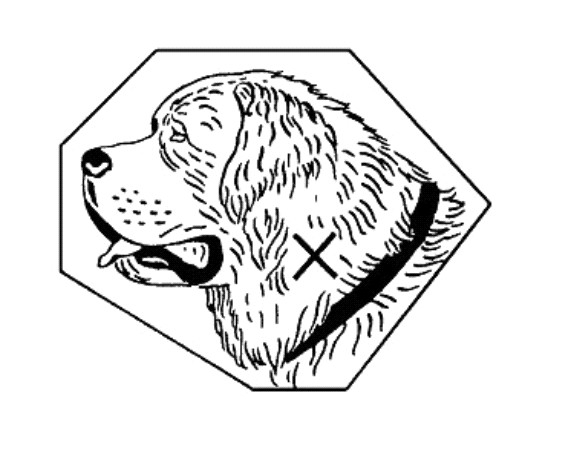
The official hallmark used for all precious metals and all fineness standards since 1995, the "head of a St. Bernard dog"

Distinctive symbols appear in place of the "X" on the ear of the St. Bernard dog.
Place	Symbol
Biel / Bienne	B
Basel	*
Chiasso	T
Geneva	G
La Chaux-de-Fonds	C
Le Noirmont	J
Zurich	Z

Under the current law, on all gold, silver, platinum or palladium watches cases made in Switzerland or imported into Switzerland, there shall be affixed, near the Maker's Responsibility Mark and his indication of purity, the official Hallmark, the head of a Saint Bernard dog. Only precious metal watch cases must be hallmarked. Swiss hallmarking for other articles such as jewelry and cutlery is optional.

In addition to the Swiss hallmark, all precious metal goods may be stamped with the Common Control Mark of the Vienna Convention.

=== Netherlands ===
The Netherlands, who are members of the International hallmarking Convention, have been striking hallmarks since at least 1814. Like many other nations, the Netherlands require the registration and use of Responsibility Marks, however, perhaps somewhat unusual, there is a book published entitled "Netherlands' Responsibility Marks since 1797" (in three volumes and in the English language) illustrating all the responsibility marks registered there since that time. This is significant since producers that exported precious metal goods to the Netherlands would have been required to register their marks.

The Dutch government markets their assay services/office as the "Jewellery Gateway in and to Europe." The Netherlands' hallmarks are also recognized in other EU countries and thus can be sold in Austria, France, Ireland, Portugal, Spain and the United Kingdom without further testing. The Netherlands' hallmarks are also recognized in Belgium, Denmark, Finland and Sweden, which have voluntary hallmarking systems.

One of the two Dutch assay offices, WaarborgHolland b.v., is located in Gouda between the Amsterdam and Rotterdam airports. The other one is located in Joure, called Edelmetaal Waarborg Nederland b.v. The Netherlands recognises platinum, gold, silver and palladium as precious metals.

=== India ===
The BIS (Bureau of Indian Standards) Hallmark is a hallmarking system for gold as well as silver jewellery sold in India certifying the purity of the metal. It certifies that the piece of jewellery conforms to a set of standards laid by the Bureau of Indian Standards, the national standards organization of India.

== Marking techniques ==
=== Punching ===
Traditionally, the hallmarks are "struck" using steel punches. Punches are made in different sizes, suitable for tiny pieces of jewelry to large silver platters. Punches are made in straight shank or ring shank, the latter used to mark rings. The problem with traditional punching is that the process of punching displaces metal, causing some distortion of the article being marked. This means that re-finishing of the article is required after hallmarking. For this reason, and that off-cuts from sprues are often used for assay, many articles are sent unfinished to the assay office for assay and hallmarking.

=== Laser marking ===
A new method of marking using lasers is now available, which is especially valuable for delicate items and hollowware, which would be damaged or distorted by the punching process. Laser marking also means that finished articles do not need to be re-finished. Laser marking works by using high-power lasers to evaporate material from the metal surface. Two methods exist: 2D and 3D laser marking. 2D laser marking burns the outline of the hallmarks into the object, while 3D laser marking better simulates the marks made by punching.

== Methods of assay ==
Precious metal items of art or jewelry are frequently hallmarked (depending upon the requirements of the laws of either the place of manufacture or the place of import). Where required to be hallmarked, semi-finished precious metal items of art or jewelry pass through the official testing channels where they are analyzed or assayed for precious metal content. While different nations permit a variety of legally acceptable finenesses, the assayer is actually testing to determine that the fineness of the product conforms with the statement or claim of fineness that the maker has claimed (usually by stamping a number such as 750 for 18k gold) on the item. In the past the assay was conducted by using the touchstone method but currently (most often) it is done using X-ray Fluorescence (XRF). XRF is used because this method is more exacting than the touchstone test. The most exact method of assay is known as fire assay or cupellation. This method is better suited for the assay of bullion and gold stocks rather than works or art or jewelry because it is a completely destructive method.

=== Touchstone ===
The age-old touchstone method is particularly suited to the testing of very valuable pieces, for which sampling by destructive means, such as scraping, cutting or drilling is unacceptable. A rubbing of the item is made on a special stone, treated with acids and the resulting color compared to references. Differences in precious metal content as small as 10 to 20 parts per thousand can often be established with confidence by the test. It is not indicated for use with white gold, for example, since the color variation among white gold alloys is almost imperceptible.

=== X-ray fluorescence ===
The modern X-ray fluorescence is also a non-destructive technique that is suitable for normal assaying requirements. It typically has an accuracy of up to five parts per thousand and is well-suited to the relatively flat and large surfaces. It is a quick technique taking about three minutes, and the results can be automatically printed out by the computer. It also measures the content of the other alloying metals present. It is not indicated, however, for articles with chemical surface treatment or electroplated metals.

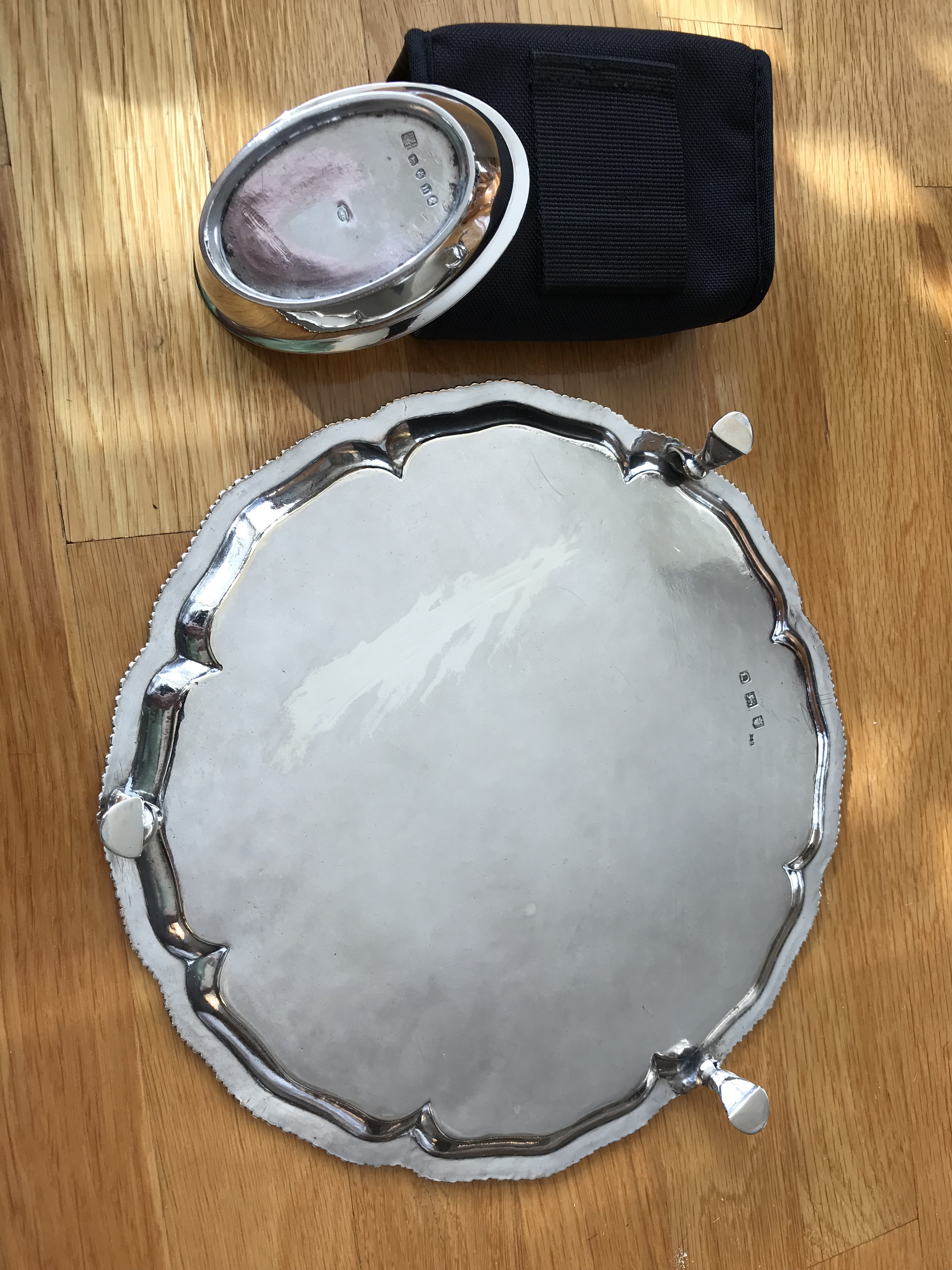
These two pieces of hallmarked English silver show assay "scrapes," where a small amount of silver was removed from the underside of the item in order to perform a fire assay. The 10 3/4" salver (Richard Rugg, 1759) shows a large scrape. The salt cellar (Robert & Samuel Hennell, 1803) has a much smaller scrape - however the cellar was from a set of at least four, allowing for scrapes to be combined.

=== Fire assay ===
The most elaborate, but totally destructive, assay method is the fire assay, or cupellation. As applied to gold bearing metallics, as in hallmark assaying, it is also known as cupellation and can have an accuracy of 1 part in 10,000. In this process the article is melted, the alloys separated and constituents weighed. Since this method is totally destructive, when this method is employed for the assay of jewelry, it is done under the guise of random or selective sampling. For example, if a single manufacturer deposits a lot of rings or watch cases, while most are assayed using the non-destructive methods a few pieces from the lot are randomly selected for fire assay.

=== Other methods ===
There are methods of assay noted above which are more properly suited for finished goods while other methods are suitable for use on raw materials before artistic workmanship has begun. Raw precious metals (bullion or metal stock) are assayed by the following methods: silver is assayed by titration, gold is assayed by cupellation and platinum is assayed by ICP OES spectrometry.

== See also ==
- Assay office
- Merchant's mark
- Certification mark
- Mint mark
- Trademark
- Silver hallmarks
- State quality mark of the USSR
