= Edinburgh Assay Office =

Coordinates: 55.9573°N 3.1888°W

The assay office marks - from left to right, London, Birmingham, Sheffield, and Edinburgh.

The Edinburgh Assay Office is the last remaining assay office in Scotland and one of four which remain in the United Kingdom.

The Edinburgh Assay Office traces its hallmarking history back to the Gold and Silver Work Act 1457 (c. 8 (S)) the first hallmarking act for Scotland. It is an independent privately run business, owned by the Incorporation of Goldsmiths of the City of Edinburgh. Since 1457, the deacon, or leader of the craft, assayed and marked the members' wares. However, in 1681, a dedicated Assay Master, John Borthwick, was appointed to oversee this task. The incorporation's importance in the life of the city and country was confirmed in 1687 when King James VII granted it a royal charter.

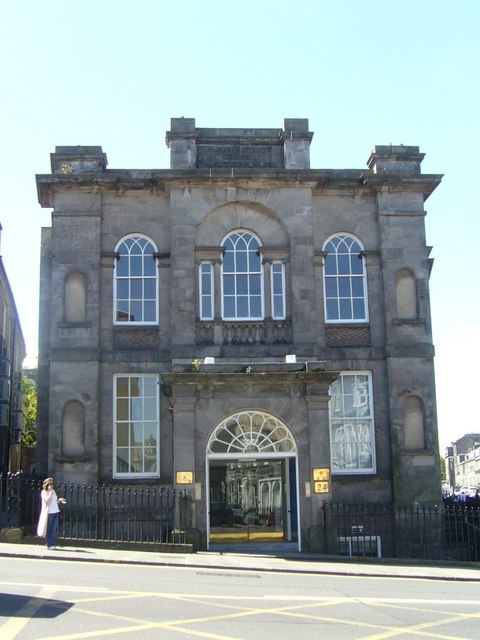
Edinburgh's Assay Office (formerly Albany Street Chapel)

The Edinburgh Assay Office is housed in a category B listed building, Goldsmiths Hall in the Broughton Street. It is a former church, built in 1816, which was fully refurbished and opened as the assay office in 1999 by Princess Anne.

The assay office primarily tests and hallmarks precious metal. The Hallmarking Act 1973 was passed, then in 2010 palladium became the fourth precious metal to be assayed.
