= Worshipful Company of Goldsmiths =

Livery company of the City of London

Coordinates: 51.5158°N 0.0957°W

Goldsmiths' Company
- Goldsmiths' arms: Quarterly Gules and Azure in the first and fourth quarters a Leopard's Face Or in the second and third quarters a Covered Cup and in chief two Round Buckles the tongues fesswise points to the dexter all of the Third. The Company's hallmark for gold is a Leopard's Face ducally crowned.
- Motto: Justitia Virtutum Regina
- Location: Goldsmiths' Hall, London EC2, England
- Date of formation: 1327; 699 years ago
- Company association: Gold and silversmithing
- Order of precedence: 5th
- Master of company: Brig. Ed Butler CBE DSO (Prime Warden for 2025/26)
- Website: thegoldsmiths.co.uk

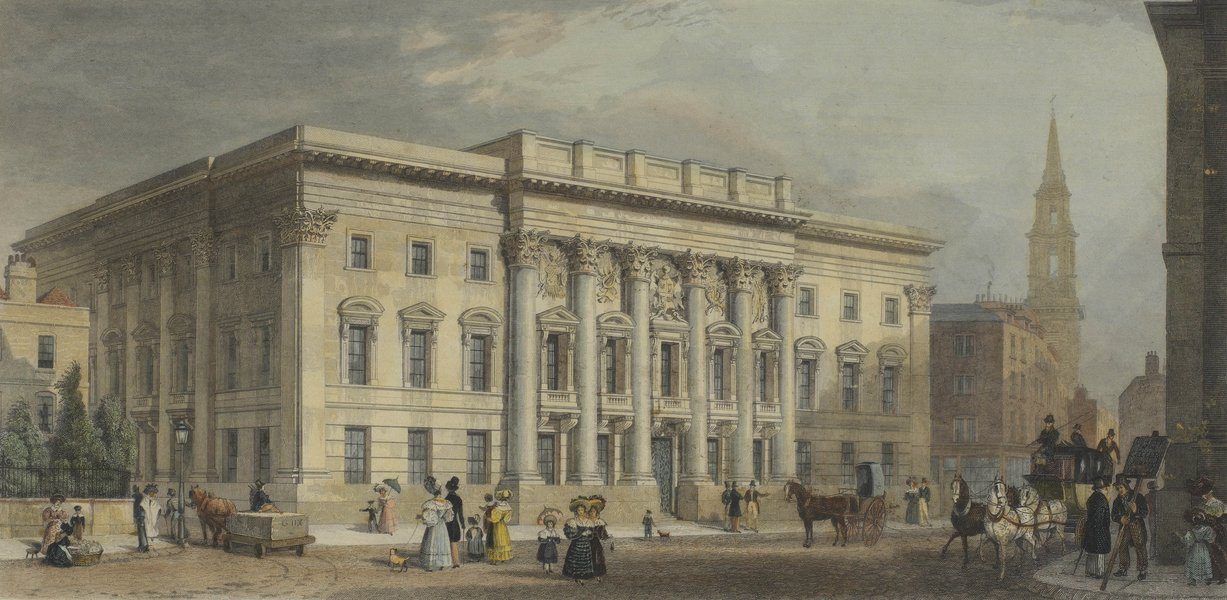
The third and present Goldsmiths' Hall in the late 19th century

The Worshipful Company of Goldsmiths (commonly known as The Goldsmiths' Company and formally styled The Wardens and Commonalty of the Mystery of Goldsmiths of the City of London), is one of the Great Twelve Livery Companies of the City of London, headquartered at Goldsmiths' Hall, London EC2.

The company, which originates from twelfth-century London, received a Royal Charter in 1327 and ranks fifth in precedence of the City Livery Companies.

Its motto is Justitia Virtutum Regina, Latin for Justice is Queen of Virtues.

== History ==
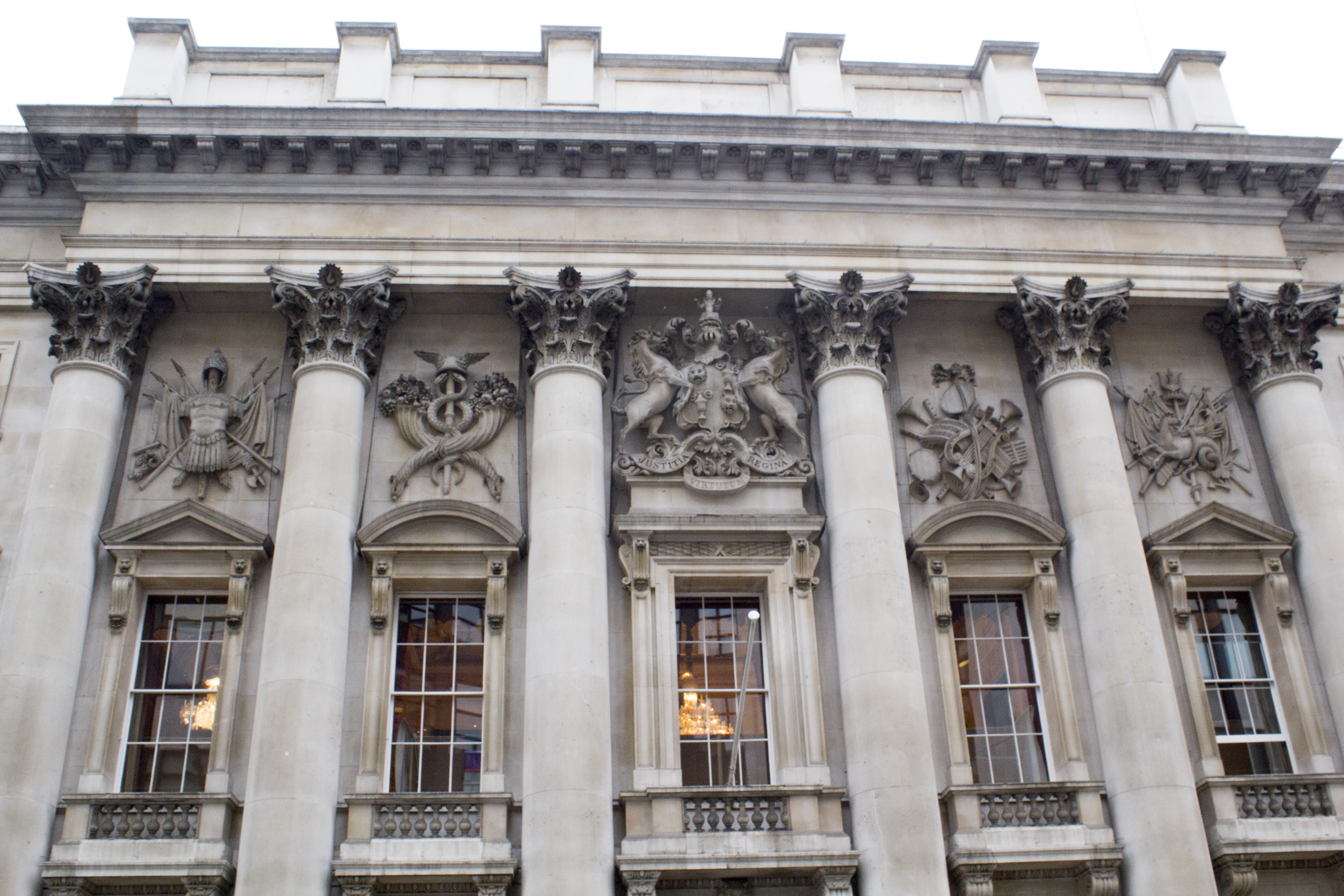
Frontage of Goldsmiths' Hall, EC2

Established as a medieval guild for the goldsmith trade, the term hallmarking derives from precious metals being officially inspected and marked at Goldsmiths' Hall in the City of London. They were an influential guild, supplying more than 50 Lord Mayors of London.

Its guild church of St John Zachary in Maiden Lane in Covent Garden was destroyed in the Great Fire of London in 1666.

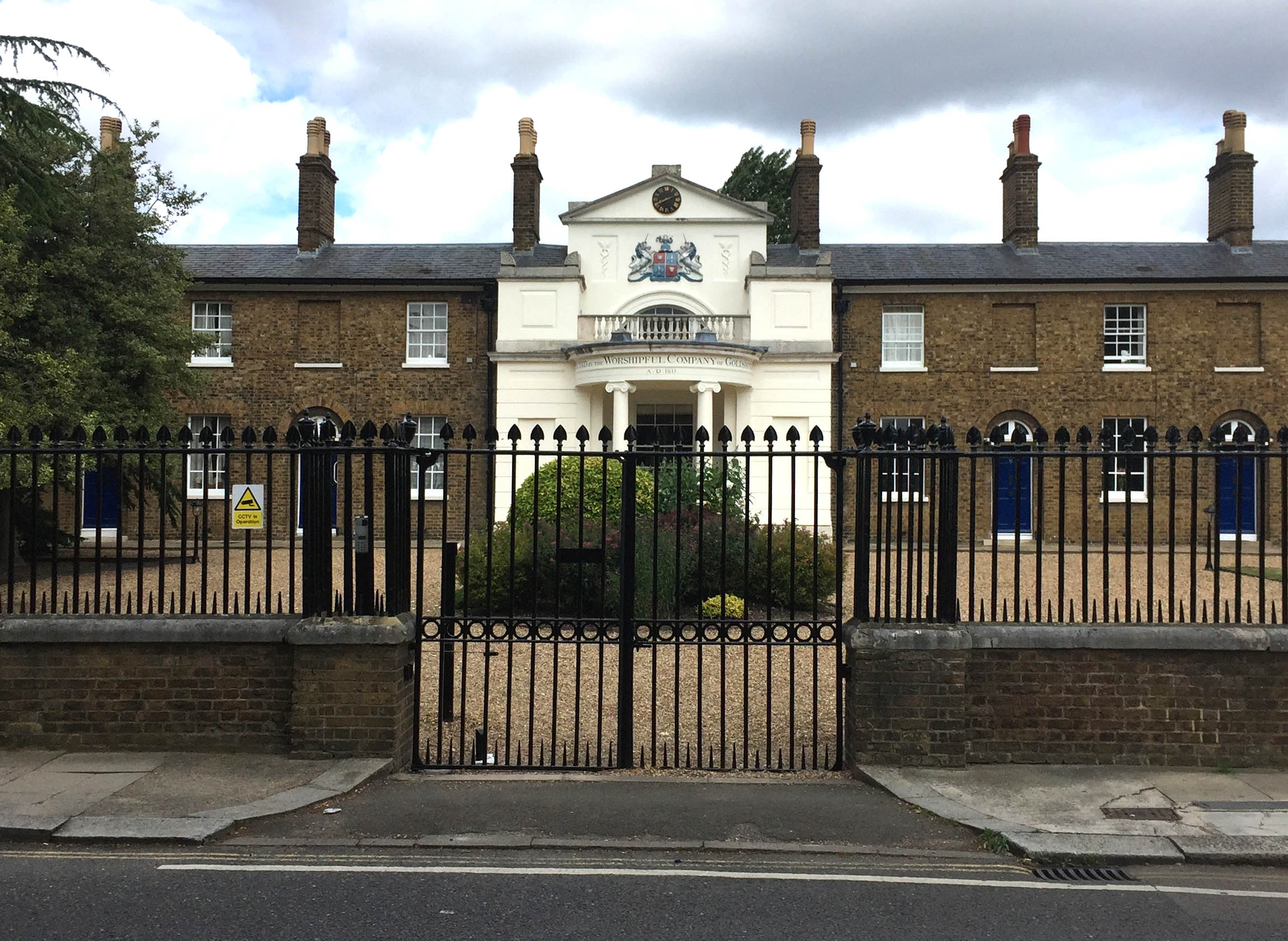
Goldsmiths' Alms Houses, Acton W3

In 1812, twenty almshouses were built on the former Perryn estate in Acton, on land bequeathed to the company by Alderman John Perryn in 1657.

In 1891, the Goldsmiths' Company founded the Goldsmiths' Technical and Recreative Institute, becoming Goldsmiths' College then Goldsmiths, University of London.

== Current Role ==
One of the few Livery Companies today playing a formal role in its ancient trade, it oversees the Goldsmiths' Company Assay Office, where objects made of precious metals are tested for purity, and then marked with an official symbol should they pass the necessary tests. At the Trial of the Pyx, the Goldsmiths' Company is also responsible for checking the validity of British coinage.

The Goldsmiths' Company also maintains a library and archive for those wishing to research goldsmithing, silversmithing and hallmarking.

== List of select recent Prime Wardens ==
- 1950/52: Godfrey Allen
- 1984: Arthur Grimwade
- 2004: Bryan Toye
- 2008: Grant Macdonald
- 2012: Hector Miller
- 2013: Richard Agutter
- 2014: William Parente
- 2016: Michael Wainwright
- 2017: Judith Cobham-Lowe
- 2018: Michael Prideaux
- 2019: Timothy Schroder
- 2020: Richard Fox
- 2021: Dame Lynne Brindley
- 2022: Lord Bridges
- 2023: Charles Mackworth-Young
- 2024: Richard Reid
- 2025: Brigadier Ed Butler (698th)

=== Goldsmiths' Centre ===
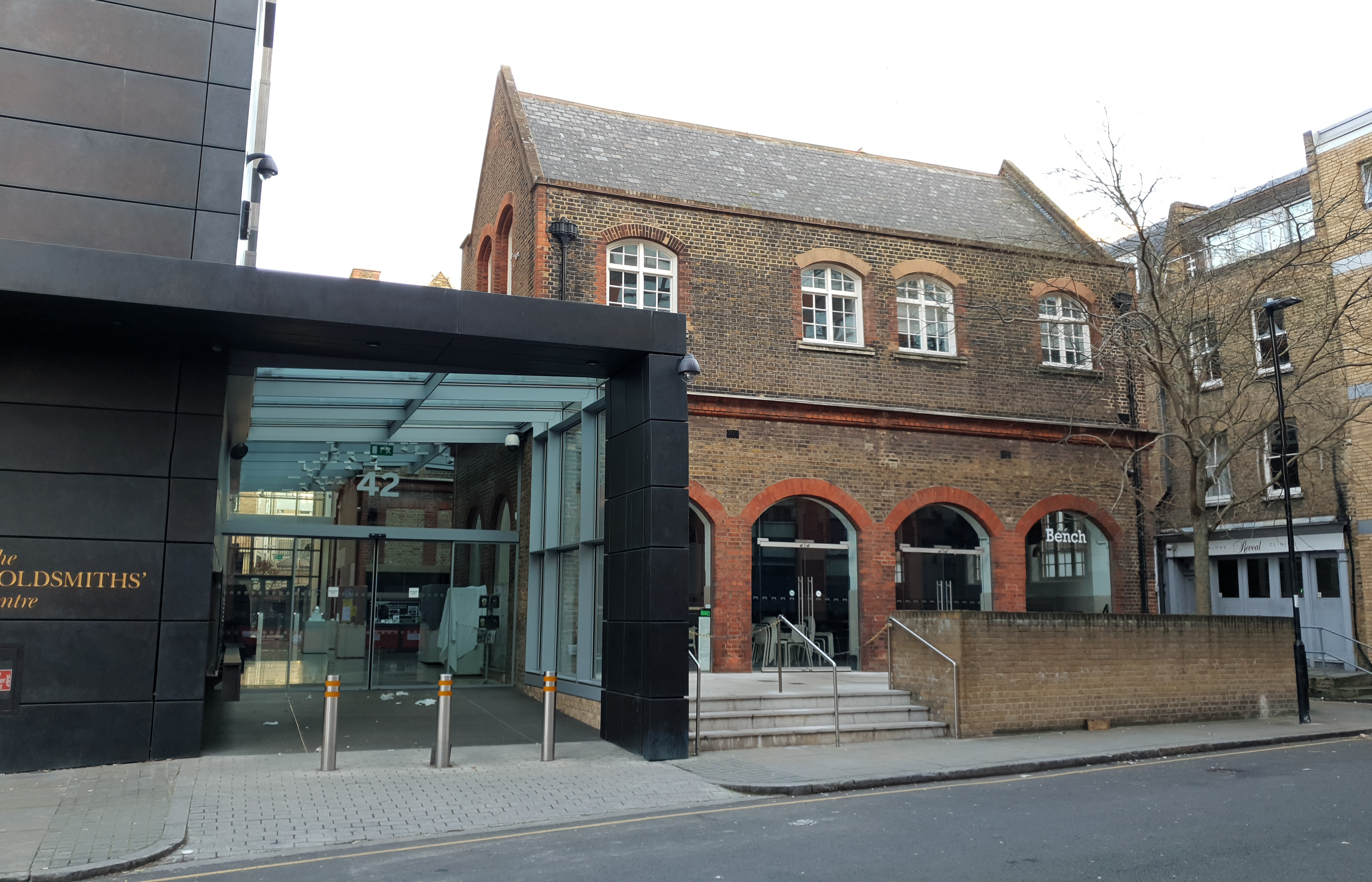
Goldsmiths’ Centre, Clerkenwell EC1

In 2012 the Goldsmiths’ Centre, a space for workshops, exhibitions and events, and education including apprentice training, opened in Clerkenwell.

=== Current activities ===
In July 2017, the Goldsmiths' Company announced it was to become a founding partner of the new Museum of London, donating £10 million to the new site. It also announced a contribution of £250,000 to Westminster Abbey for the Queen's Diamond Jubilee Galleries, which opened in 2018.

The Goldsmiths’ Company supports two large educational initiatives, providing funding for a science initiative in primary schools created by Imperial College London and the National Theatre’s programme of streamed recordings for primary schools.

== See also ==
- Great Twelve City Livery Companies
- Harache family
