= The Goldsmiths' Company Assay Office =

Assay office in the United Kingdom

Coordinates: 51.5157°N 0.0959°W

The Goldsmiths' Company Assay Office in London (also known as Assay Office London or the London Assay Office (LAO)) is the oldest assay office in the United Kingdom. The company has provided hallmarking services since The Worshipful Company of Goldsmiths was founded in the 14th century. The company received its royal charter in 1327 and ranks fifth in order of precedence of the 12 great livery companies of the City of London.

== History ==
Hallmarking dates back to the 14th century when Edward I of England passed a law requiring any item made of silver, which was offered for sale to be at least of equal quality as that of the coin of the realm (silver currency). The four wardens of the Goldsmiths' Company were tasked with visiting workshops in the City of London to assay (test) silver articles. If these articles were found to be below standard they were originally forfeit to the king, but if they passed, each article received the king's mark of authentication which was the mark of a leopard's head. By 1478, there were several hundred workshops and merchants manufacturing silver articles in the City of London. It was not possible for the wardens to visit them all so the merchants were ordered to bring their items to Goldsmiths' Hall for testing and marking and a permanent assay office was established in the building. This is the origin of the term hallmark – struck with the king's mark at Goldsmiths' Hall.

In 1544 the Goldsmith's Company adopted the king's mark as their town mark and the mark of the leopard's head is now internationally recognised as the mark of this assay office.

The Leopard's head hallmark over time

Precious metals are rarely used in their pure form, as they are too soft. Gold, silver, platinum and palladium are generally mixed (alloyed) with copper or other metals to create an alloy that is more suitable to the requirements of the jeweller or silversmith. The hallmark indicates the amount of precious metal in the alloy in parts per thousand (the millesimal fineness). In addition to indicating the town where the item was marked, a unique sponsor's or maker's mark identifies the item's origin and a date letter to represent the year of marking.

Traditional hallmarks

=== Today ===
The Goldsmiths' Company Assay Office is still based at Goldsmiths' Hall and remains the oldest company in Britain to be continually trading from the same site. However, it also has two satellite offices; at Greville Street in Hatton Garden in the heart of the London jewellery quarter and within a high-security complex at London's Heathrow airport, where it handles parcels imported from foreign manufacturers.

In addition to hallmarking, the office also offers a range of services to support the jewellery trade and enforcement authorities. It offers a variety of specialist analytical services including nickel testing, antique silver dating, non-destructive compositional analysis, plating thickness measurement and a melt and assay service for scrap precious metal carried out in their fully independent on-site laboratory. Other services offered are a jewellery valuation service, laser marking, trading standards assistance, high-quality photography and the provision of a comprehensive range of training and educational seminars, lectures and specialist events.

== See also ==
- List of companies based in London
