= Metallurgical assay =

Compositional analysis of an ore, metal, or alloy

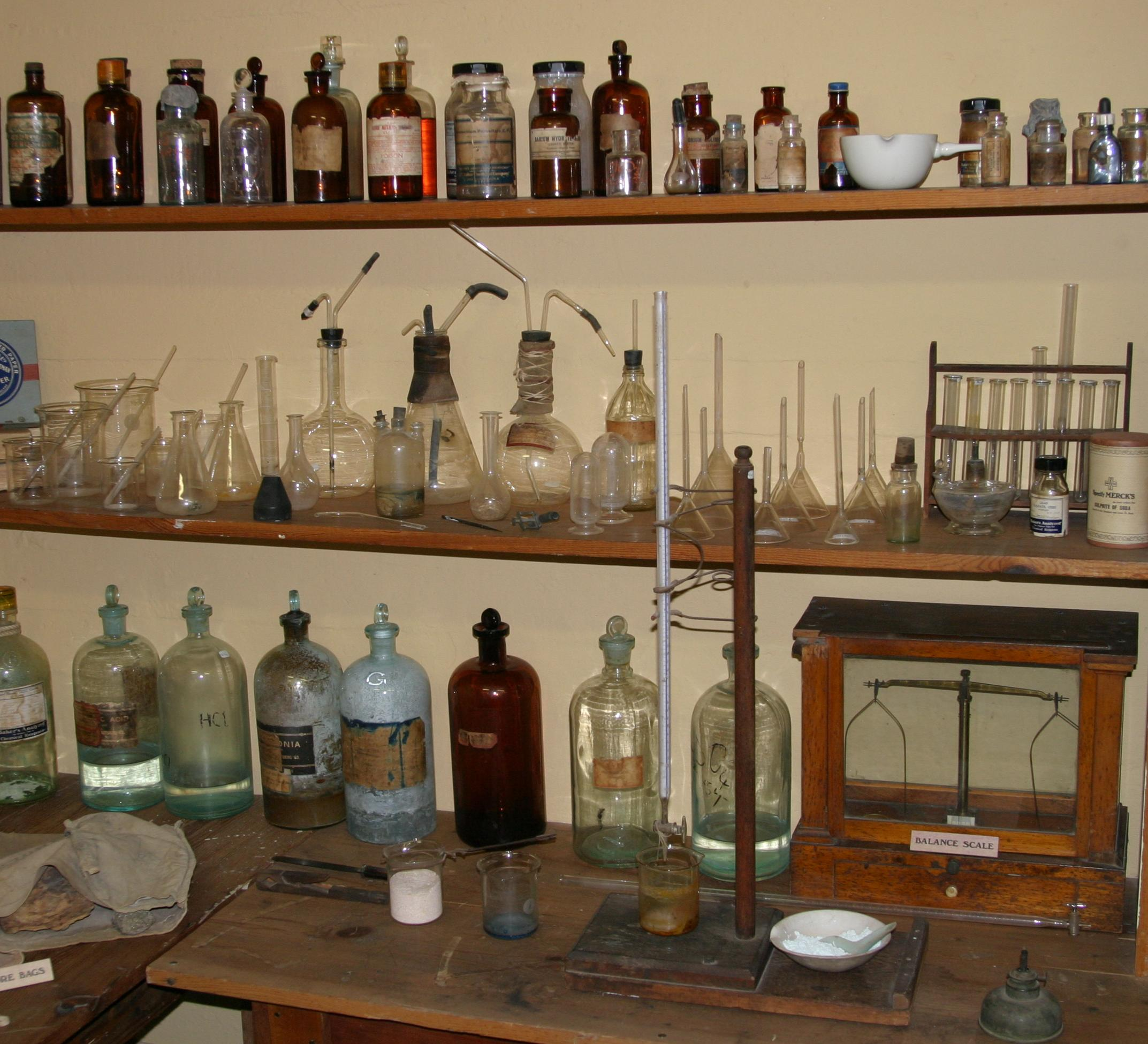
A 19th-century assay laboratory in Tombstone Courthouse State Historic Park, Arizona

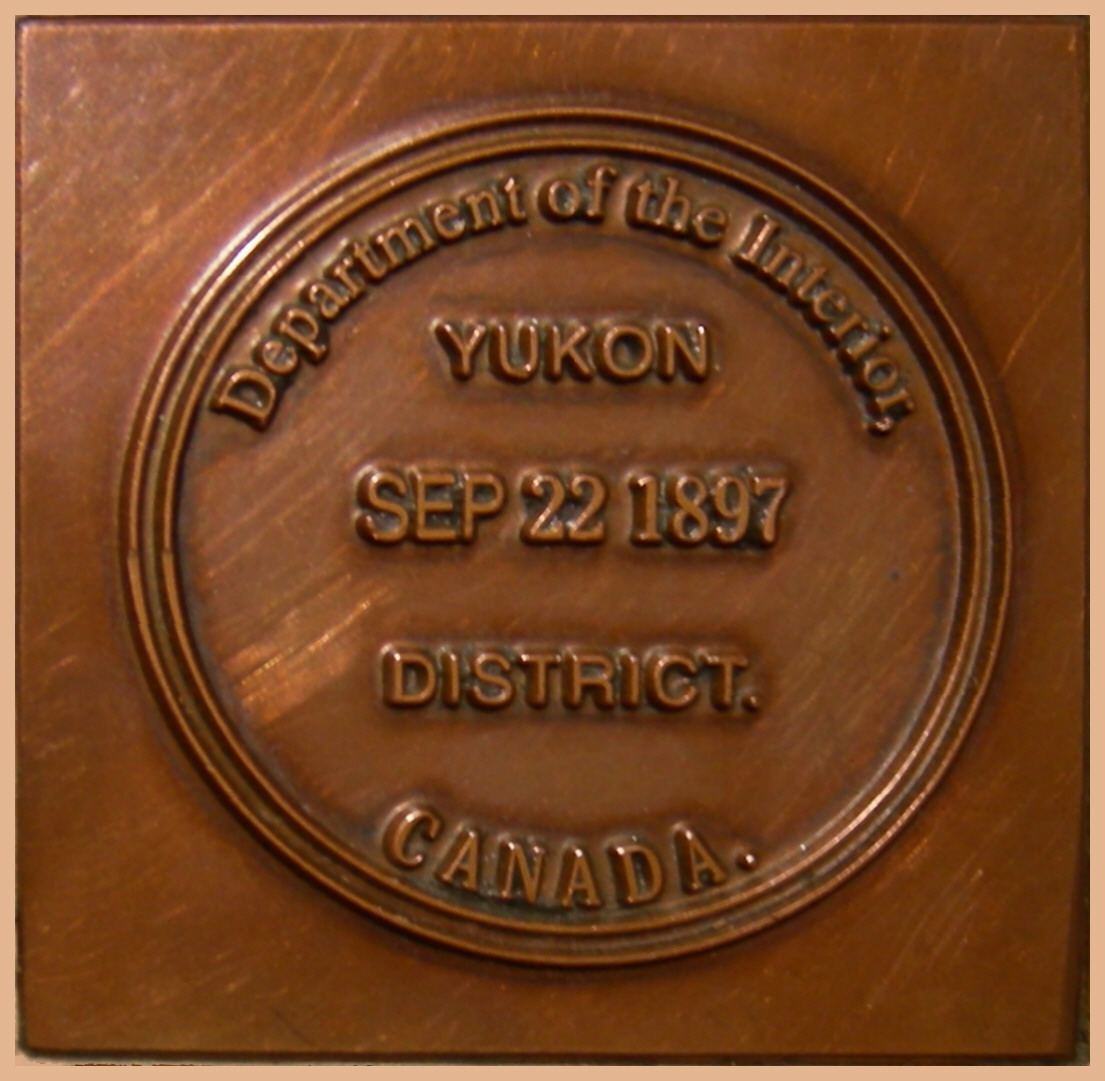
A model of a late 19th-century Canadian (Yukon) seal used to certify the quality of assayed gold

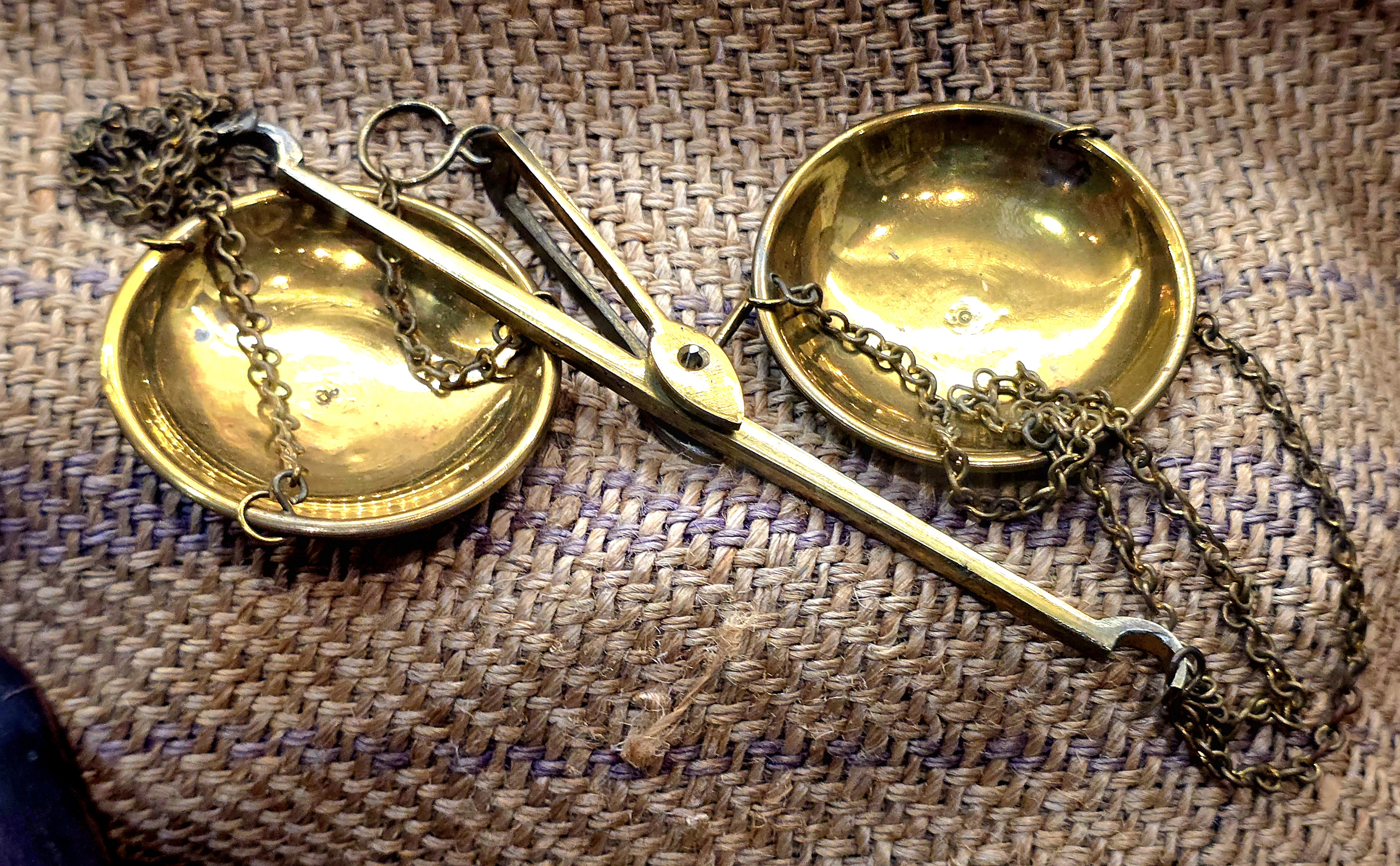
A portable scale (ca. 1840 - 1860) used for assaying gold ore

A metallurgical assay is a compositional analysis of an ore, metal, or alloy, usually performed in order to test for purity or quality.

Some assay methods are suitable for raw materials; others are more appropriate for finished goods. Raw precious metals (bullion) are assayed by an assay office. Silver is assayed by titration, gold by cupellation and platinum by inductively coupled plasma optical emission spectrometry (ICP OES). Precious metal items of art or jewelry are frequently hallmarked (depending upon the requirements of the laws of either the place of manufacture or the place of import). Where required to be hallmarked, semi-finished precious metal items of art or jewelry pass through the official testing channels where they are analyzed or assayed for precious metal content. While different nations permit a variety of legally acceptable finenesses, the assayer is actually testing to determine that the fineness of the product conforms with the statement or claim of fineness that the maker has claimed (usually by stamping a number such as 750 for 18k gold) on the item. In the past the assay was conducted by using the touchstone method but currently (most often) it is done using X-ray fluorescence (XRF). XRF is used because this method is more precise than a touchstone test. The most exact method of assay is known as fire assay or cupellation. This method is better suited for the assay of bullion and gold stocks rather than works of art or jewelry because it is a completely destructive method.

== Touchstone ==
The touchstone method is most common by far and does not damage the item in question. A rubbing of the item is made on a special stone, treated with acids and the result is compared to the result of the same process done on a sample of gold with a known purity. Red radiolarian chert or black siliceous slate were used for this. Differences in precious metal content as small as 10 to 20 parts per thousand can often be established with confidence by the test, using acids and gold samples both of a specific, known concentration.

== X-ray fluorescence ==
The modern X-ray fluorescence (XRF) is also a non-destructive technique that is suitable for normal assaying requirements. It typically has an accuracy of 2 to 5 parts per thousand and is well-suited to relatively flat and large surfaces. It is a quick technique taking about three minutes, and the results can be automatically printed out by computer.

One process for X-ray fluorescence assay involves melting the material in a furnace and stirring to make a homogeneous mix. Following this, a sample is taken from the centre of the molten sample. Samples are typically taken using a vacuum pin tube. The sample is then tested by X-ray fluorescence spectroscopy. For quantitative XRF assays, calibration and control of sample geometry and matrix effects are important for reliable results.

== Fire assay/cupellation ==
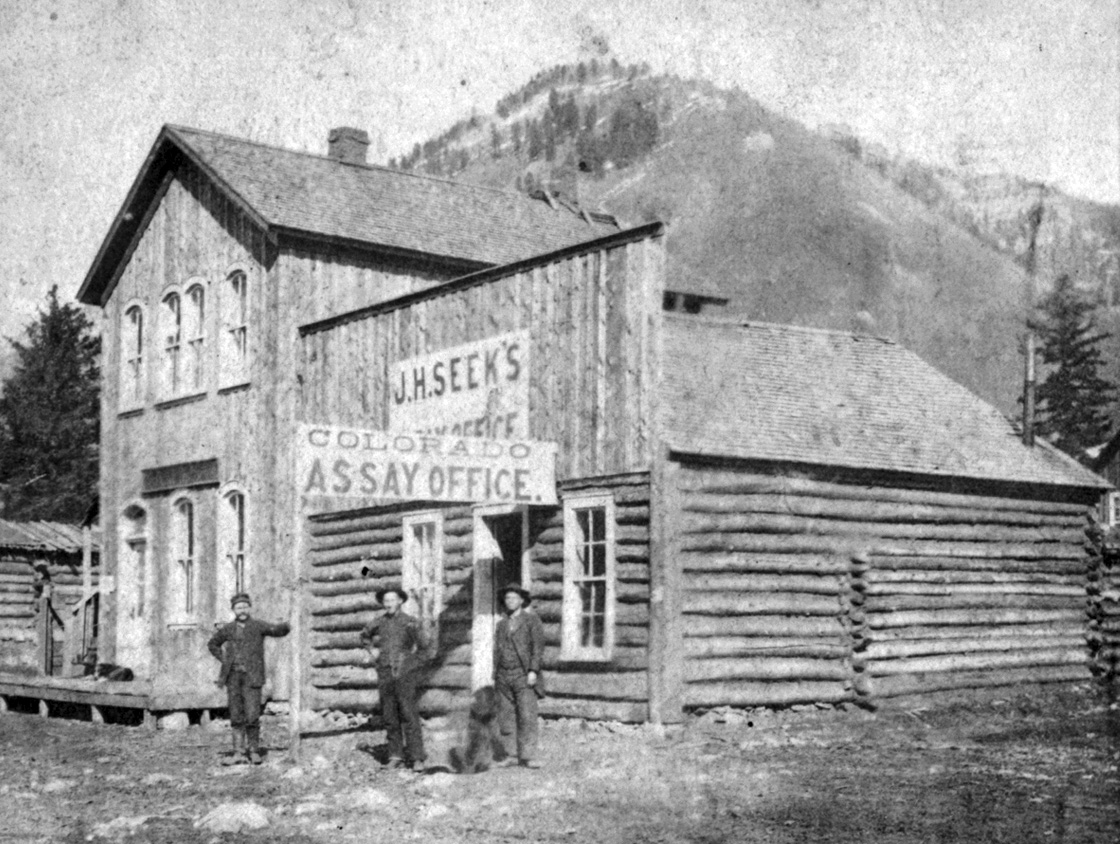
Colorado assay office – c. 1870 A.D.

The most accurate, but totally destructive, precious metal assay is fire assay. (It may also be called by the critical cupellation step that separates precious metal from lead.) If performed on bullion to international standards, the method can be accurate on gold metal to 1 part in 10,000. If performed on ore materials using fusion followed by cupellation separation, detection may be in parts per billion. However, accuracy on ore material is typically limited to 3 to 5% of reported value. Although time-consuming, the method is the accepted standard applied for valuing gold ore as well as gold and silver bullion at major refineries and gold mining companies. In the case of fire assaying of gold and platinum ores, the lengthy time required to carry out an assay is generally offset by carrying out large numbers of assays simultaneously, and a typical laboratory will be equipped with several fusion and cupellation furnaces, each capable of taking multiple samples, so that several hundred analyses per day can be carried out. The principal advantage of fire assay is that large samples can be used, and these increase the accuracy in analyzing low-yield ores in the <1g/T range of concentration.

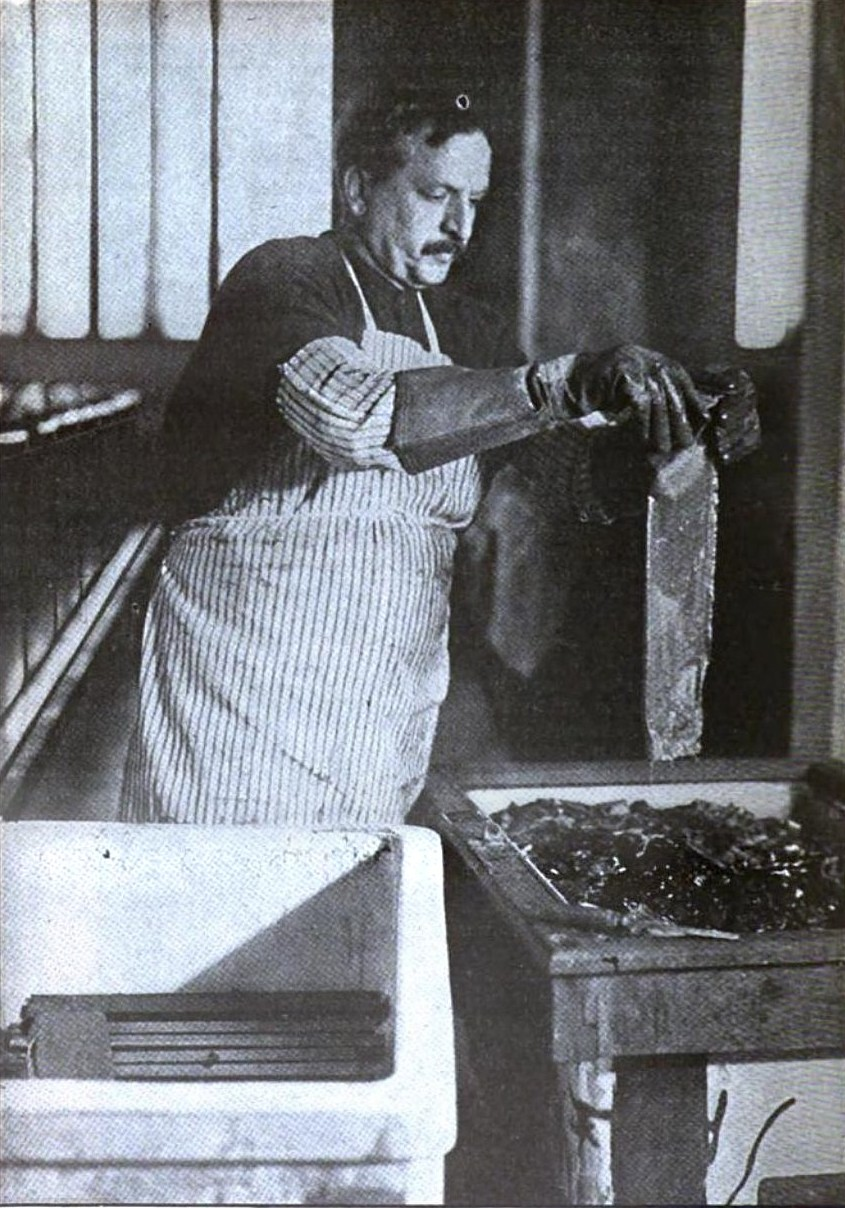
1916 photograph of an assayer performing an electrolysis test on a gold sample at the United States Assay Office in New York

Fusion: the process requires a self-generating reducing atmosphere, and so the crushed ore sample is mixed with fluxes and a carbon source (e.g. coal dust, ground charcoal, flour, etc.) mixed with powdered lead oxide (litharge) in a refractory crucible. In general, multiple crucibles will be placed inside an electric furnace fitted with silicon carbide heating elements, and heated to between 1,000 and 1,200 °C. The temperature required, and the type of flux used, are dependent on the composition of the rock in which the precious metals are concentrated, and in many laboratories an empirical approach based on long experience is used.

A complex reaction takes place, whereby the carbon source reduces the lead oxide to lead, which alloys with the precious metals: at the same time, the fluxes combine with the crushed rock, reducing its melting point and forming a glassy slag. When fusion is complete, the sample is tipped into a mold (usually iron) where the slag floats to the top, and the lead, now alloyed with the precious metals, sinks to the bottom, forming a 'button'. After solidification, the samples are knocked out, and the lead bullets recovered for cupellation, or for analysis by other means.

Method details for various fire assay procedures vary, but concentration and separation chemistry typically comply with traditions set by Bugby or Shepard & Dietrich in the early 20th century. Method advancements since that time primarily automate material handling and final finish measurements (i.e., instrument finish rather than physical gold product weighing). Arguably, even these texts are largely an extension of traditions that were detailed in De re metallica by Agricola in 1556.

Variation from skills taught in modern standard adaptations of fire assay methodology should be viewed with caution. The standard traditions have a long history of reliability; "special" new methods frequently associate with reduced assay accuracy and fraud.

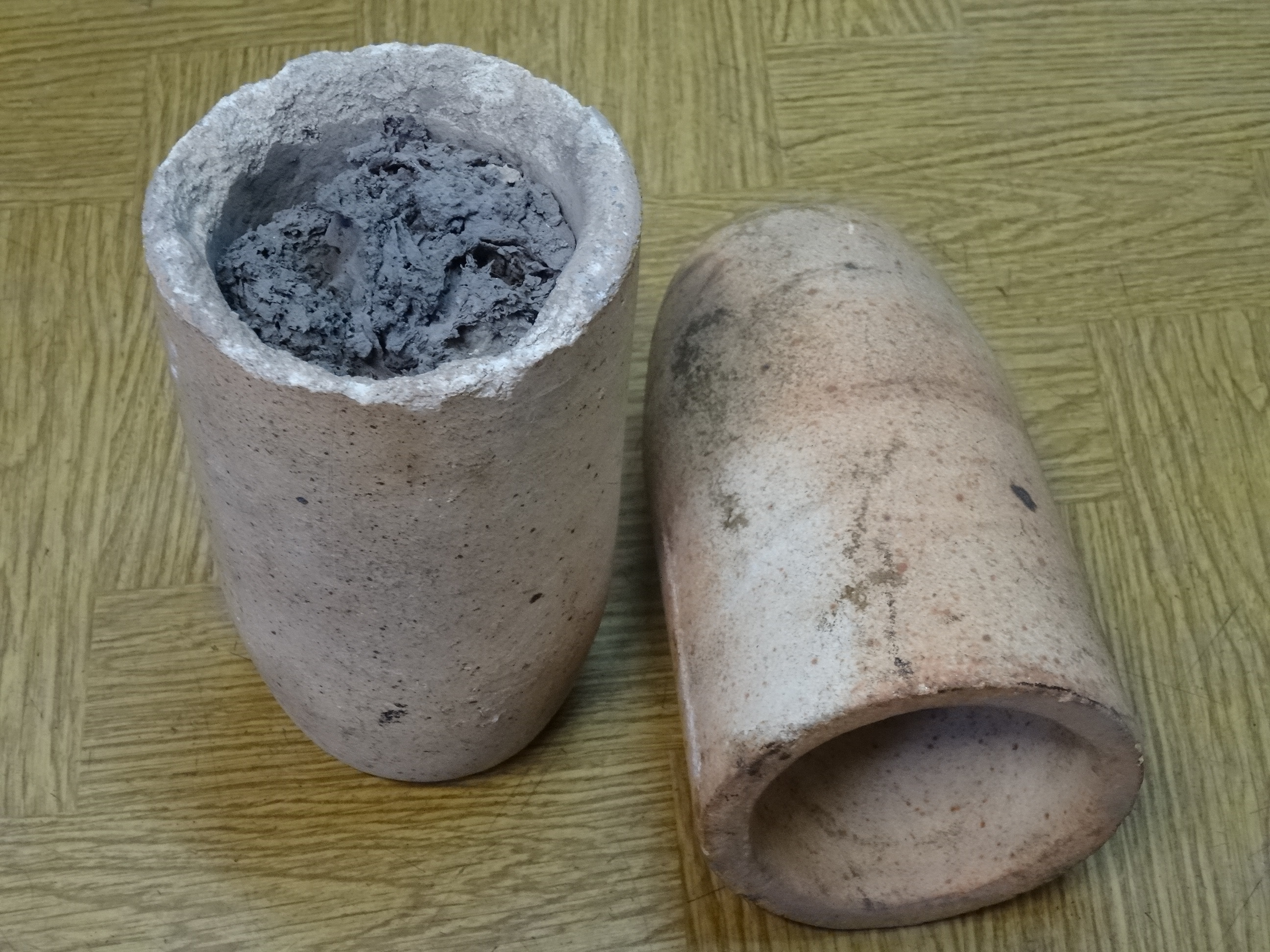
Cupels for assays and refining noble metals

Cupellation: the lead bullets are placed in porous crucibles (cupels) of bone ash or magnesium oxide and heated in air to about 1,000 °C. This is usually carried out in a 'muffle' furnace, containing a refractory muffle (usually nitride-bonded silicon carbide) heated externally by silicon carbide heating elements. A flow of air through the muffle assists oxidation of the lead, and carries the fumes for safe collection outside the furnace unit. The lead melts and oxidises to lead oxide, which in turn melts and is drawn into the pores of the cupel by capillary attraction. The precious metals remain in the base of the cupel as a 'prill' which is sent for final analysis of precious metal content.

In the bullion fire assay process, a sample from the article is wrapped in a lead foil with copper and silver. The wrapped sample, along with prepared control samples, heated at 1,650 °F (or 898.9 °C; temperature varies with exact method) in a cupel made of compressed bone ash or magnesium oxide powder. Base metals oxidize and absorb into the cupel. The product of this cupellation (doré) is flattened and treated in nitric acid to remove silver. Precision weighing of metal content of samples and process controls (proofs) at each process stage is the basis of the extreme method precision. European assayers follow bullion traditions based in hallmarking regulations. Reputable North American bullion assayers conform closely to ASTM E1335, the ASTM standard test method for determining gold in bullion by fire assay cupellation analysis. Only bullion methods validated and traceable to accepted international standards obtain genuine accuracies of 1 part in 10,000.

Cupellation alone can only remove a limited quantity of impurities from a sample. Fire assay, as applied to ores, concentrates, or less pure metals, adds a fusion or scorification step before cupellation.

== Coins ==
A coin assayer is often assigned to each mint or assay office to determine and assure that all coins produced at the mint have the correct content or purity of each metal specified, usually by law, to be contained in them. This was particularly important when gold and silver coins were produced for circulation and used in daily commerce. Few nations, however, persist in minting silver or gold coins for general circulation. For example, the U.S. discontinued the use of gold in coinage in 1933. The U.S. was one of the last nations to discontinue the use of silver in circulating coins after its 1970 A.D. half dollar coin, although the amount of silver used in smaller denomination coins was ended after 1964. Even with the half dollar, the amount of silver used in the coins was reduced from 90% in 1964 and earlier to 40% between 1965 and 1970. Copper, nickel, cupro-nickel and brass alloys now predominate in coin making. Notwithstanding, several national mints, including the Perth Mint in Australia, the Austrian Mint, the British Royal Mint, the Royal Canadian Mint, the South African Mint, and the U.S. Mint continue to produce precious metal bullion coins for collectors and investors. The precious metal purity and content of these coins is guaranteed by the respective mint or government, and, therefore, the assay of the raw materials and finished coins is an important quality control.

In the UK, the Trial of the Pyx is a ceremonial procedure for ensuring that newly minted coins conform to required standards.
