= Brick tax =

British property tax (1784–1850)

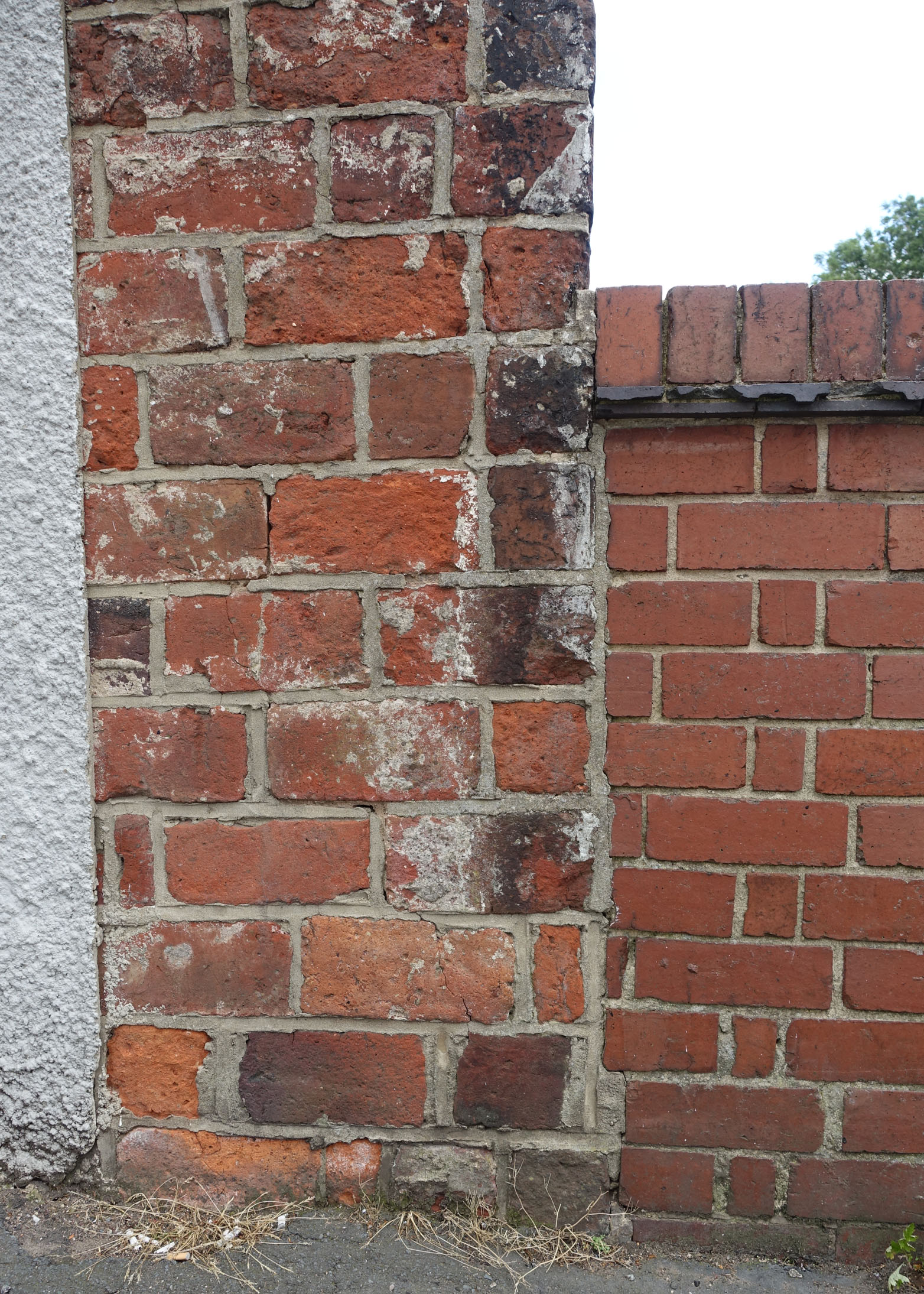
Wilkes' Gobs oversize bricks in the wall of former Ashby Canal warehouse alongside modern bricks of bridge parapet, High Street, Measham.

The brick tax was a property tax introduced in Great Britain in 1784, during the reign of King George III, to help pay for the wars in the American Colonies. Bricks were initially taxed at 2s 6d per thousand. The brick tax was eventually abolished in 1850.

== Proposal ==
The brick tax was first proposed by Lord George Lyttelton in 1756. The proposal was perceived as partial since parts of Britain used mainly stone for building and also as unfair since (it was believed) the tax would fall less heavily on the rich as their houses were more likely to be built from stone. Lyttelton failed to pass the brick tax proposal and consequently started to promote tax on publicans, which (at the rate of 1l. per a business licence) was calculated to generate considerably more revenue than the brick tax.

The brick tax was proposed and rejected again in 1778.

The brick tax finally passed in 1784, in the Duties on Bricks and Tiles Act 1784 (24 Geo. 3. Sess. 2. c. 24), to cover costs of the War of American Independence. The reason bricks were chosen to be the subject of the tax was that there had been a significant growth in popularity of the material in the late 1700s.

== Development ==
The brick tax was levied on bricks before burning. To be able to examine if a brick had been taxed, the mould would have the word 'excise' on it which would leave an imprint on the brick.

Brick were originally taxed at 2s 6d per thousand. The tax was increased to 4s per thousand in 1794 and again to 5s in 1797.

To mitigate the effects of the tax, manufacturers began to increase the size of their bricks. Many buildings built by Joseph Wilkes in Measham, Leicestershire, used bricks known as Wilkes' gobs that were 9 1/4 in × 4 1/4 in × 4 1/4 in (230 mm × 110 mm × 110 mm).

In 1801, the government responded by limiting the dimensions of a brick to 10 in × 5 in × 3 in (254 mm × 127 mm × 76 mm) and doubling the tax on bricks that were larger. The maximum size applied to the mould, meaning the finished bricks were smaller due to shrinkage while burning the bricks.

The final raise of the brick tax was in 1805 giving the price of 5s 10d per thousand bricks.

The brick tax was finally abolished in 1850 by the Brick Duties Repeal Act 1850 (13 & 14 Vict. c. 9), by which time it was considered to be a detriment to industrial development.

== Consequences ==
One of the consequences of the brick tax was that some minor brick producers went out of business, forced to sell their stock to meet tax arrears. It also had an effect on architecture, with many areas returning to the use of timber and weatherboarding in house construction, especially weather tiles to simulate brick work, known as mathematical tiles.

The brick tax caused the price of brick to grow, which meant that construction and rent became more expensive.

Until the Excise Duties, etc., on Tiles Repeal Act 1833 (3 & 4 Will. 4. c. 11) the brick tax also applied to tiles and pipes. The taxation of pipes led to a lower quality of housing as many households could not afford drainage pipes due to their increased price. Tiles were taxed based on the size and level of decoration, which made people use plain tiles, which were the cheapest. That resulted in a setback of the development of architecture and style.

After the repeal of the brick tax in 1850, we can see an improvement of brick quality in churches and public buildings. Moreover, buildings constructed before 1784 and after 1850 show more ornaments than buildings built during the time of the brick tax.

== Acts ==
Brick tax was regulated by the following acts of Parliament:

- Duties on Bricks and Tiles Act 1784 (24 Geo. 3. Sess. 2. c. 24) – repealed by Duties on Bricks Act 1839
- Duties on Bricks and Tiles Act 1785 (25 Geo. 3. c. 66) – repealed by Duties on Bricks Act 1839
- Customs and Excise Act 1787 (27 Geo. 3. c. 13) – repealed by Statute Law Revision Act 1871,
- Duties on Bricks and Tiles Act 1794 (34 Geo. 3. c. 15) – repealed by Duties on Bricks Act 1839
- Excise Act 1796 (37 Geo. 3. c. 14) – repealed by Statute Law Revision Act 1861
- Excise Act 1801 (41 Geo. 3. (U.K.) c. 91) – repealed by Statute Law Revision Act 1861
- Excise Act 1803 (43 Geo. 3. c. 69) – repealed by Statute Law Revision Act 1861
- Excise (Ireland) Act 1826 (7 Geo. 4. c. 49) – repealed by Statute Law Revision Act 1873
- Excise Duties, etc., on Tiles Repeal Act 1833 (3 & 4 Will. 4. c. 11) – repealed by Statute Law Revision Act 1874
- Duties on Bricks Act 1839 (2 & 3 Vict. c. 24) – repealed by Brick Duties Repeal Act 1850
- Brick Duties Repeal Act 1850 (13 & 14 Vict. c. 9) – repealed by Statute Law Revision Act 1875

== See also ==
- Glass tax
- Hearth tax
- Window tax
- Wallpaper tax
