= 24 Geo. 3 =

24 Geo. 3 is a citation that can refer to British acts of Parliament from two different sessions:

- 24 Geo. 3. Sess. 1 for acts from the fourth session of the 15th Parliament of Great Britain, passed in 1783
- 24 Geo. 3. Sess. 2 for acts from the first session of the 16th Parliament of Great Britain, passed in 1784
