= Hearth tax =

Medieval and early modern tax

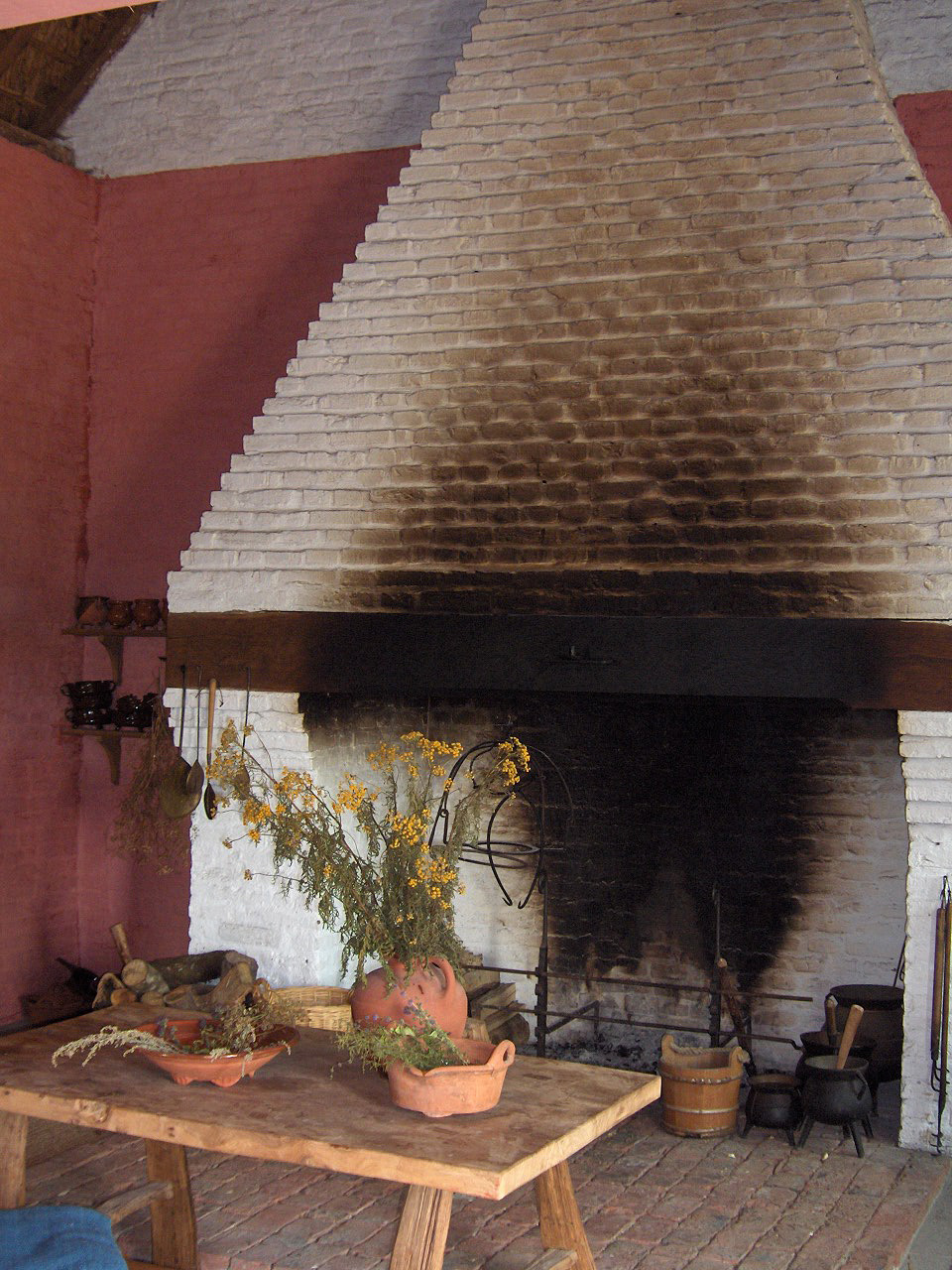
A medieval hearth in Belgium dated circa 1465

A hearth tax was a property tax in certain countries during the medieval and early modern period, levied on each hearth, thus by proxy on wealth. It was calculated based on the number of hearths, or fireplaces, within a municipal area and is considered among the first types of progressive tax.

Hearth tax was levied in the Byzantine Empire from the 9th century, France and England from the 14th century, and finally in Scotland and Ireland in the 17th century.

== History ==
=== Byzantine Empire ===
In the Byzantine Empire a tax on hearths, known as kapnikon, was first explicitly mentioned for the reign of Nicephorus I (802–811), although its context implies that it was already then old and established and perhaps it should be taken back to the 7th century AD. Kapnikon was a tax levied on households without exceptions for the poor.

=== France ===
In the 1340s especially, the King of France's personal expenditure on dowries, gratuities, the upkeep of the palace, his travels and his wardrobe, consumed the entirety of the royal income. The fouage (Latin: focagium) was assessed on the basis of households and was usually paid by towns in a pre-arranged lump sum raised in any manner the locality chose to employ. It existed in certain French provinces, and became widespread in the 14th century when the royal finances were unable to bear the rising costs of war and state agents. In particular, fouages were levied in 1342 and 1349.

=== England ===
==== Middle Ages ====
The hearth-penny was an Anglo-Saxon term for Peter's pence.

==== Stuart period ====
Fire-Hearth and Stoves Taxation Act 1662
- Act of Parliament
- Parliament of England
- Long title: An Act for establishing an additional Revenue upon His Majestie His Heires & Successors for the better support of His and theire Crown and Dignity.
- Citation: 14 Cha. 2. c. 10 (Note: This is the citation in The Statutes of the Realm.); 13 & 14 Cha. 2. c. 10 (Note: This is the citation in The Statutes at Large.)
- Territorial extent: England and Wales

Dates
- Royal assent: 19 May 1662
- Commencement: 25 March 1662 (Note: Start of session.)
- Repealed: 25 March 1689
Other legislation
Repealed by	Hearth Money Act 1688
Relates to	Hearth Money Act 1663; Hearth Money Act 1664

Status: Repealed

Text of statute as originally enacted

Hearth Money Act 1663
- Act of Parliament
- Parliament of England
- Long title: An Additionall Act for the better ordering and collecting the Revenue ariseing by Hearth Money
- Citation: 15 Cha. 2. c .13
- Territorial extent: England and Wales

Dates
- Royal assent: 27 July 1663
- Commencement: 18 February 1663
- Repealed: 25 March 1689
Other legislation
Repealed by	Hearth Money Act 1688
Relates to	Fire-Hearth and Stoves Taxation Act 1662; Hearth Money Act 1664; Importation Act 1666

Status: Repealed

Text of statute as originally enacted

Hearth Money Act 1664
- Act of Parliament
- Parliament of England
- Long title: An Act for collecting the Duty ariseing by Hearth-money by Officers to be appointed by His Majestie.
- Citation: 16 Cha. 2. c. 3
- Territorial extent: England and Wales

Dates
- Royal assent: 17 May 1664
- Commencement: 16 March 1664
- Repealed: 25 March 1689
Other legislation
Repealed by	Hearth Money Act 1688
Relates to	Fire-Hearth and Stoves Taxation Act 1662; Hearth Money Act 1663

Status: Repealed

Text of statute as originally enacted

In England, hearth tax, also known as hearth money, chimney tax, or chimney money, was a tax imposed by Parliament in 1662, to support the government expenditure of King Charles II. Following the Restoration of the monarchy in 1660, Parliament calculated that the Crown needed an annual income of £1,200,000. The hearth tax was a supplemental tax to make up for the shortfall. It was considered easier to establish the number of hearths than the number of heads, insofar as hearths could be easily counted, were difficult to conceal or demolish, and did not move. This form of taxation was new to England, but had precedents abroad. It generated considerable debate, but was supported by the economist Sir William Petty, and carried through the Commons by the influential West Country member Sir Courtenay Pole, 2nd Baronet (whose enemies nicknamed him "Sir Chimney Poll" as a result). The Fire-Hearth and Stoves Taxation Act 1662 (14 Cha. 2. c. 10) received royal assent on 19 May 1662, with the first payment due on 29 September 1662, Michaelmas.

One shilling was liable to be paid for every fire hearth or stove, in all dwellings, houses, edifices or lodgings, and was payable at Michaelmas, 29 September and on Lady Day, 25 March. The tax thus amounted to two shillings per hearth or stove per year. The original bill contained a practical shortcoming in that it did not distinguish between owners and occupiers and was potentially a major burden on the poor as there were no exemptions. The bill was subsequently amended so that the tax was paid by the occupier. Further amendments introduced a range of exemptions that ensured that a substantial proportion of the poorer people did not have to pay the tax.

Exemptions from the hearth tax
Not paying Poor or Church Rates
Inhabiting a house, tenement or land worth less than 20 shillings (£1) rent per annum
Assets worth less than £10
Private ovens, furnaces, kilns and blowing houses
Hospitals and almshouses where revenue less than £100 per annum

Exemption certificates had to be signed by a minister, a churchwarden, or an overseer of the poor and two justices of the peace. From 1664, everybody whose home had more than two hearths was liable to pay the tax, even if otherwise exempt, and changes were made to reduce the scope for tax avoidance.

Revenue generated in the first year was less than expected, so from 1663, the names and number of hearths were required to be listed even if non-liable. This additional detail has made the relevant hearth tax documents particularly useful to modern historians and other researchers. However, details of householders who were not liable to pay the tax were not recorded for all years of its operation, as they were not needed for audit purposes when the right to collect the tax was "farmed" for collection by contractors in return for their payment of a fixed premium.

The arrangements for collecting the hearth tax varied during its lifetime:

- 1662 to 1664: The tax was collected by petty constables, with supervision and administration through the existing machinery of local government.
- 1664 to 1665: Receivers (commonly known as "chimney-men") were appointed specifically to collect the tax.
- 1666 to 1669: The right to collect the tax was leased or "farmed out" to three City of London merchants, in exchange for a premium.
- 1669 to 1674: A central government office called "Agents for the Hearth Tax" supervised collection by directly employed receivers.
- 1674 to 1684: The tax was again farmed out.
- 1684 to 1689: A special government commission collected both the excise and hearth tax.

The tax fell most heavily on those who occupied the houses with the greatest number of hearths. For instance, in 1673-4 the Earl of Exeter had to pay for 70 hearths at Burghley House. In contrast, most householders who were liable to pay tax had only one or two hearths and a significant proportion of householders were not liable to pay at all.

The hearth tax was much resented because it often entailed inspection of the interior of dwellings by the sub-collectors and petty constables, who had legal authority to enter every property to check on the number of hearths. Some people stopped up their chimneys so that the tax was not due on them, but where this was discovered by the assessors the tax was doubled. On 31 July 1684, a fire in Churchill, Oxfordshire, destroyed 20 houses and many other buildings, and killed four people. It was apparently caused by a baker who, to avoid chimney tax, had knocked through the wall from her oven to her neighbour's chimney. Sir Courtenay Pole, its principal author, was attacked for having devised "the most vexatious tax on the people that ever was known."

Hearth Money Act 1688
- Act of Parliament
- Parliament of England
- Long title: An Act for the takeing away the Revenue ariseing by Hearth-Money.
- Citation: 1 Will. & Mar. c. 10; 1 Will. & Mar. Sess. 1. c. 10
- Territorial extent: England and Wales

Dates
- Royal assent: 24 April 1689
- Commencement: 25 March 1689
- Repealed: 15 July 1867
Other legislation
Repeals/revokes	Fire-Hearth and Stoves Taxation Act 1662; Hearth Money Act 1663; Hearth Money Act 1664
Repealed by	Statute Law Revision Act 1867

Status: Repealed

Text of statute as originally enacted

After the Glorious Revolution, the hearth tax was repealed by the newly empowered English Parliament in the Hearth Money Act 1688 (1 Will. & Mar. c. 10), agreed to by the newly installed William III and Mary II in 1689, as:

not only a great oppression to the poorer sort, but a badge of slavery upon the whole people, exposing every man’s house to be entered into, and searched at pleasure, by persons unknown to him.

At the end of the Glorious Revolution in 1688, William III and Mary II also agreed to and signed the English Bill of Rights 1689 marking a new level of co-operation and power sharing between Parliament and the English monarchs. The cancellation of the hearth tax and the signing of the Bill of Rights, etc. led to a greater measure of legal protection for life, liberty, and property in England that encouraged and empowered the middle class at the beginning of the Industrial Revolution. This action both signalled the end of several centuries of tension and conflict between the Crown and Parliament, and the end of the idea that English kings had any divine rights and that England would be restored to Roman Catholicism. The new King William III and his wife Mary II were Protestant leaders from the Dutch Republic who were invited by Parliament to rule England. To make up for the loss of tax revenue, due to the cancellation of the hearth tax, uniform property taxes were imposed with few exclusions.

=== Scotland ===
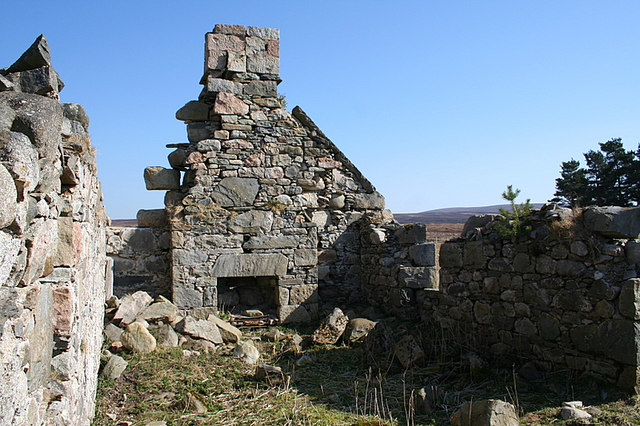
Derelict cottage hearth in Scotland

By the Supply (No. 4) Act 1690 (September c. 5) the Parliament of Scotland granted a tax of 14 shillings on every hearth, payable by both landowners and tenants, to raise money for the army with only hospitals and the poor living on parish charity being exempt, the tax being collected from 1691 to 1695.

=== Ireland ===
Unlike in England, which abolished the Hearth Tax in 1689, it continued in the Kingdom of Ireland till the early 19th century although it underwent major reform at end of the 18th century. It was levied half yearly by the sheriff of each county on the basis of lists of the names of householders compiled by local justices of the peace. The list of the households required to pay the Hearth Tax became known as the Hearth Money Rolls, which were arranged by county, barony, parish, and townland. The tax was sometimes collected over an area known as a 'walk', which was based on both the town and a large rural area outside the town.

Several attempts were made in Parliament to abolish or at least limit the proportion of households obliged to pay the tax, which was widely regarded as "a shameful infliction upon the poor peasant, to whom even two or three shillings in the year for such a tax was a burden and a wrong". The chief proposers of a radical change were Thomas Conolly and John O'Neill. In 1788, for example, they argued that for a substantial portion of those having to pay the tax, the yearly cash demand was an unreasonable burden. Henry Grattan developed the same point: "I am convinced, that the man who has but five pounds in the world, and pays thirty shillings for his house, ought not to pay hearth-money; the strongest argument for his relief is the bare statement of his condition….The wretchedness of their living, and the misery of their consumption, is the reason why they scarcely pay any tax but the hearth-money, and is likewise a reason why they should not even pay hearth-money."

Major reform of the hearth tax was finally carried out in 1793 whereby one-hearth households with less than £10 in personal property, or with houses and land worth £5 or less, were henceforth deemed exempt from the tax. The measure was apparently a consequence of parliamentary pressure in the previous session; the modification of the window tax in Britain giving total relief to poorer householders had led to calls in the Irish Parliament for similar "liberality" in the light of Ireland's healthy finances. The Chancellor of the Exchequer (William Pitt) had refused, but a parliamentary committee was established under the de facto chairmanship of Mr G. P. Bushe who successfully proposed that one-hearth householders should be divided into two groups: those above and those below £5 in annual valuation. Subsequently, in 1795, freedom from hearth tax was extended to all one-hearth householders, as the opposition had earlier demanded; at the same time, the tax on multiple-hearth houses was raised. The number of persons exempted from the hearth tax was estimated at between a million and a half to two million.

The original Hearth Money Rolls are not extant. The records were housed in the Four Courts in Dublin, the repository for the Public Records Office, but during the Irish Civil War in 1922 the building was destroyed by fire, which also destroyed the Rolls (along with the Ireland census records for 1821, 1831, 1841, and 1851), but copies of some of the Rolls have survived.

== Hearth tax research ==
The comprehensiveness and near-national coverage of hearth tax returns differentiates this historical evidence from other pre-modern surveys and tax records. Unlike other taxation surveys, the hearth tax recorded the names of those who were not liable to pay the tax, and hence provides a means of looking at a full range of social groups.

The work of C. A. F. Meekings during the mid-twentieth century is an important resource for hearth tax research. It provides useful commentaries on hearth tax manuscripts in The National Archives (TNA), and arranges the hearth tax files in order according to the different systems of administration. Meekings' compilation of hearth tax accounts, which was published posthumously, is a useful resource for economic historians.

Further information on hearth taxes, as well as other Stuart taxes and loyalty lists, is provided by Jeremy Gibson, which offers a comprehensive summary of hearth tax returns and assessments, whether in TNA, county record offices, or other libraries and archives. Each digest includes a brief commentary on the date, geographical coverage, state of the manuscript, approximate number of names included, and details of complete or partially published editions.

An additional resource for hearth tax research is Elizabeth Parkinson's study of the establishment of the tax and the complexities of its administration in the period 1662–1666. This work provides assistance with deciphering the technical details of hearth tax documents, which otherwise might appear to be little more than lists of names and numbers.

=== Approaches to hearth tax research ===
A principal focus of interest in the hearth tax lies in its application for understanding the distribution of wealth among social ranks within geographical areas. The method of connecting bands of hearth numbers to social categories was pioneered by William George Hoskins, looking at the city of Exeter. His system has subsequently been adjusted by local historians and, as Tom Arkell noted, these adaptations depend upon a 'particular locality's structure, but this diversity, combined with too many variables, prevents effective comparison between most of these [local] studies'.

During the 1980s Arkell's discussion of the eight hearth tax records for Kineton hundred in Warwickshire enabled detailed comparisons to be made between the data for 1662–1666 and 1669–1674, and to test the extent of the coverage of each record. This led him to conclude that 'the proportions of different hearth tax categories remained remarkably stable for the hundred's six best assessments'.

A decade later, Margaret Spufford cleared a path for local historians interested in studying local variations in wealth and poverty at county and parish levels, and set out the relevance of the hearth tax to architectural history and genealogy. She developed Hoskins' argument that the numbers of hearths in a household could be equated with levels of personal wealth, and that by organising the properties into groups determined by the number of hearths, historians could assess patterns of wealth and poverty which distinguished between social categories. She placed this system within a national template and tested the divergences in wealth between counties, areas within counties, and parishes.

Tom Arkell responded in The Local Historian, putting forward an alternative approach which drew upon an array of published and unpublished data. First, he argued for the aggregation of data from different returns in the mid-1660s and the early 1670s to produce more reliable statistics, thereby overcoming the problems of damaged or incomplete records. Second, he suggested that the percentage of households with three hearths and above provided a clear way of identifying regional variations in wealth, especially when groups of parishes with broadly similar percentages were grouped together into sub-regions. Third, he provided a national table of sub-regions graded by the proportion of dwellings with three hearths and over.

Both Arkell and Spufford used statistics and maps to enable readers to quickly appreciate the relative position of a parish, or groups of parishes, in relation to counterparts in a county, and to extrapolate to the national level by making comparisons between case studies.

Since 2010 the Centre for Hearth Tax Research has turned its attention to the digital humanities as a way of researching and publishing the Restoration hearth tax.

In 2019, the centre launched a new website "Hearth Tax Digital". This replaced Hearth Tax Online, established in 2010 and taken down in 2017. Hearth Tax Digital is a new platform for the publication and dissemination of research and analysis on hearth tax records and other associated documents. It provides a unique window into society and the social character of England in the late seventeenth century. It acts both as a portal through which the Hearth Tax Project & Centre can circulate data and findings, and also as a forum for other research centres, historical groups or individuals to publish work allied to hearth tax studies. Hearth Tax Digital provides free access to personal name data as well as analysis of the distribution of both population and wealth in urban and rural communities in England.

The advanced search function allows historians to combine searches for personal names, place names and other words occurring in the texts (e.g. blind, Mrs, seaman) with searches by hearth numbers. This function operates in the manner of database technology. The great advantage of the website developed by Professor Vogeler and Dr Wareham is that it goes beyond the traditional database functions to provide historical information rooted in the documents in terms of the original order in which they were written. Searches by place to reveal the lists of the names of all the householders in the parish or township, and searches for individual householders return the name of that householder in the context of the names of other householders who were their neighbours. The same approach is also used in the Records page, which means as readers scan their eyes down the returns they are able to follow in the footsteps of the collectors and consider local geographies of population distribution and the divide between rich and poor on a street-by-street basis. All searches are linked to a data basket function whereby groups of entries from the search enquiries are brought together which the user can store for further analysis, or indeed bring together a series of single entries highlighted from reading the returns in the records pages.

A final word should be reserved for exemption certificates. Until recently there was relatively little concern with the exemption certificates that recorded the names of the householders who were not liable to pay the hearth tax. For the West Riding there are around 650 of these certificates, helping to fill the gaps for some areas where the exempt are under-recorded in the returns and assessments; and in the East Riding of Yorkshire volume the data from 55 selected exemption certificates in compared to a series of returns between 1670 and 1674 to check completeness of coverage. This research facilitates further understanding of those people who were beneath the tax threshold and the terminology which was used to describe poorer property.

=== Organisations ===
The Centre for Hearth Tax Research is based at the University of Roehampton, London. The primary objective of the Centre for Hearth Tax Research is to publish, in a hard-copy volume, the best surviving hearth tax return or returns for every county in England where a satisfactory return has not already been published. However, this represents a long-term project and it will be several years before some county volumes are completed.

The centre was established in 1995 (then known as the Centre for Hearth Tax Studies) under the direction of Professor Margaret Spufford. The current director is Dr Andrew Wareham and the research officer is Aaron Columbus.

In 2000, the award of a grant from the Heritage Lottery Fund paid for the microfilming of all of the taxation returns stored in The National Archives and a publishing partnership was established between the centre and the British Record Society which has led to the publication of a number of county volumes, including recent volumes on Essex (2012), London and Middlesex (2014), Yorkshire East Riding (2016) and the city of Bristol (2018). Upcoming volumes include Huntingdonshire, Norfolk and Northamptonshire.

In 2004, the British Academy adopted the Hearth Tax Project and, in 2007 and 2009, the Arts and Humanities Research Council (AHRC) made awards to fund a London and Middlesex Hearth Tax Project and a research and outreach programme which assisted with the organisation of an exhibition on landscapes of poverty at the Essex Record Office which was visited by c. 1,875 people.

In 2019, the centre launched a new website "Hearth Tax Digital". This replaced Hearth Tax Online, established in 2010 and taken down in 2017. Hearth Tax Digital was created in a collaboration by the Centre for Hearth Tax Research at Roehampton University with the Zentrum für Informationsmodellierung, Universität Graz, arising from the research collaboration between Professor Vogeler and Dr Wareham. It has been funded by the British Academy and the University of Roehampton in 2018–2019, and it is hosted in the humanities digital archive infrastructure of Graz University, the GAMS. The ongoing work of the Hearth Tax Project & Centre means that new transcripts and analyses are being continually produced and, consequently, Hearth Tax will be updated as new counties are completed

The centre also operates a blog, Hearth Tax Online "Hearth Tax Online".. This is a forum by which to publish activities, analysis of the Hearth Tax, and guest blogs by those engaging with the Hearth Tax.

== See also ==
- Glass tax
- Brick tax
- Wallpaper tax
- Window tax
- Hut tax

== Bibliography ==
- "Hearth Tax in England and Wales". FamilySearch.
- Brewer, E. Cobham (1898). "Chimney Money or Hearth money". Dictionary of Phrase & Fable.
- Fossier, Robert (1986). The Cambridge Illustrated History of the Middle Ages: 1250-1520. Cambridge University Press. ISBN 0521266467.
- Wagner, John A (2006). Encyclopedia of the Hundred Years War. Greenwood Publishing Group. ISBN 031332736X.
- "Bonsall – the Growth of a Village". Bonsall History Project. pp. 6–7. Archived from the original (doc) on 26 May 2011.
