= Wallpaper tax =

17th-18th Century British property tax

The Wallpaper tax was a property tax introduced in Great Britain in 1712, during the reign of Queen Anne. Patterned, printed, or painted wallpaper was initially taxed at 1d per square yard, rising to 1s (equivalent to £3.49 as of 2025), by 1809. The tax was bypassed by purchasing untaxed plain paper and having it hand stenciled. This evasion method allowed individuals to decorate their homes without incurring the additional cost, making wallpaper more accessible to a broader audience despite the tax. The tax was abolished in 1836.

== See also ==
- Brick tax
- Glass tax
- Hearth tax
- Window tax
