= Hallmarking Act 1973 =

Act of the Parliament of the United Kingdom

Hallmarking Act 1973 (Note: Section 24(1).)
- Act of Parliament
- Parliament of the United Kingdom
- Long title: An Act to make fresh provision for the composition, assaying, marking and description of articles of, or containing, precious metals, and as to agencies for the implementation and enforcement thereof; and for purposes connected with those matters.
- Citation: 1973 c. 43
- Territorial extent: United Kingdom (Note: Section 24(3).)

Dates
- Royal assent: 25 July 1973
- Commencement: 1 January 1974 (section 13 of and schedule 4); 1 January 1975 (rest of act); (Note: Section 24(2).)

Other legislation
- Amends: See § Repealed enactments
- Repeals/revokes: See § Repealed enactments
- Amended by: Statute Law (Repeals) Act 1977; Hallmarking (Hallmarking Act Amendment) Regulations 1998; Hallmarking (Hallmarking Act Amendment) Order 1998; Government Resources and Accounts Act 2000 (Audit of Public Bodies) Order 2003; Hallmarking Act 1973 (Amendment) Regulations 2007; Hallmarking Act 1973 (Exemption) (Amendment) Order 2007; Hallmarking Act 1973 (Exemption) (Amendment No. 2) Order 2007; Companies Act 2006 (Consequential Amendments etc) Order 2008; Consumer Protection from Unfair Trading Regulations 2008; Hallmarking Act 1973 (Application to Palladium) Order 2009; Legislative Reform (Hallmarking) Order 2013; Consumer Rights Act 2015; Product Safety and Metrology etc. (Amendment etc.) (EU Exit) Regulations 2019; Digital Markets, Competition and Consumers Act 2024; Digital Markets, Competition and Consumers Act 2024 (Consequential Amendments) Regulations 2025

Status: Amended

Text of statute as originally enacted

Revised text of statute as amended

Text of the Hallmarking Act 1973 as in force today (including any amendments) within the United Kingdom, from legislation.gov.uk.

The Hallmarking Act 1973 (c. 43) is an act of the Parliament of the United Kingdom which makes up the bulk of modern law regarding the assaying and hallmarking of metals in the United Kingdom. Hallmarking is a way to guarantee the purity of precious metals. Metals are tested and, if they meet a certain minimum purity requirement, are marked with a specified seal. In the United Kingdom, this is done by the assay offices in London, Birmingham, Sheffield, and Edinburgh. The act made business transactions involving unmarked metals illegal. Trading Standards departments are responsible for enforcing the act.

Another notable consequence of the act was the formation of the British Hallmarking Council (BHC). This council is responsible for advising the Secretary of State in matters of hallmarking, ensuring that the UK has acceptable hallmarking facilities, and overseeing the assay offices so that they follow the legal hallmarking standards. The council has made many important contributions concerning UK hallmarking procedures. In 1992, the European Commission proposed a directive intended to cover hallmarking. The BHC examined the document and found multiple areas of ambiguity and deficiency. When the European Parliament voted on the council's recommendations, many were approved.

The Hallmarking Regulations 1998 and the Hallmarking Order 1998 legitimised hallmarks of other member states (those countries that ratified the Convention on the Control of Articles of Precious Metals of 1972). The council was responsible for clearing up ambiguous statements in the regulations and for extending its definition to deal with other problems in the hallmarking law. These changes include seven additional standards of fineness, a change in the standard mark, and the dropping of the date requirement on marked metals.

== Provisions ==
=== Repealed enactments ===
Section 23 of the act repealed 35 enactments, listed in parts I and II of schedule 7 to the act.

==== Part I: Public General Acts ====
Part I — Public General Acts
Citation	Short title	Description	Extent of repeal
8 & 9 Will. 3. c. 8	Standard of Silver Plate, etc. Act 1696	An Act for encouraging the bringing in wrought plate to be coined.	The whole act.
1 Ann. c. 3 (Note: This is the citation in The Statutes of the Realm.)	Assay of Plate Act 1702	An Act for continuing the Act made in the eighth year of His late Majesty's reign for better preventing the counterfeiting the current coin of this kingdom.	The whole act.
6 Geo. 1. c. 11	Plate Duty Act 1719	The Plate Duty Act 1719.	The whole act.
12 Geo. 2. c. 26	Plate (Offences) Act 1738	The Plate (Offences) Act 1738.	The whole act.
15 Geo. 2. c. 20	Gold and Silver Thread Act 1741	The Gold and Silver Thread Act 1741.	The whole act.
13 Geo. 3. c. 59	Plate (Offences) Act 1772	The Plate (Offences) Act 1772.	The whole act.
28 Geo. 3. c. 7	Gold and Silver Thread Act 1788	The Gold and Silver Thread Act 1788.	The whole act.
30 Geo. 3. c. 31	Silver Plate Act 1790	The Silver Plate Act 1790.	The whole act.
38 Geo. 3. c. 69	Gold Plate (Standard) Act 1798	The Gold Plate (Standard) Act 1798.	The whole act.
47 Geo. 3. Sess. 2. c. 15	Plate Assay (Ireland) Act 1807	The Plate Assay (Ireland) Act 1807.	The whole act.
6 & 7 Will. 4. c. 69	Plate (Scotland) Act 1836	The Plate (Scotland) Act 1836.	The whole act.
5 & 6 Vict. c. 47	Customs Act 1842	The Customs Act 1842.	The whole act.
7 & 8 Vict. c. 22	Gold and Silver Wares Act 1844	The Gold and Silver Wares Act 1844.	The whole act.
17 & 18 Vict. c. 96	Gold and Silver Wares Act 1854	The Gold and Silver Wares Act 1854.	The whole act.
18 & 19 Vict. c. 60	Wedding Rings Act 1855	The Wedding Rings Act 1855.	The whole act.
39 & 40 Vict. c. 36	Customs Consolidation Act 1876	The Customs Consolidation Act 1876.	In section 42, the words from "Clocks and watches" to "United Kingdom ".
46 & 47 Vict. c. 55	Revenue Act 1883	The Revenue Act 1883.	Sections 10 and 11.
47 & 48 Vict. c. 62	Revenue Act 1884	The Revenue Act 1884.	Sections 4 and 5.
53 & 54 Vict. c. 8	Customs and Inland Revenue Act 1890	The Customs and Inland Revenue Act 1890.	Section 17.
4 Edw. 7. c. 6	Hall-marking of Foreign Plate Act 1904	The Hall-marking of Foreign Plate Act 1904.	The whole act.
7 Edw. 7. c. 8	Assay of Imported Watch-Cases (Existing Stocks Exemption) Act 1907	The Assay of Imported Watch-Cases (Existing Stocks Exemption) Act 1907.	The whole act.
7 Edw. 7. c. 13	Finance Act 1907	The Finance Act 1907.	Section 5.
3 & 4 Geo. 5. c. 27	Forgery Act 1913	The Forgery Act 1913.	Sections 5(4)(b), 8(2)(a) and 16(2)(d). Section 6, so far as it relates to any die used for the marking or stamping of gold or silver plate, or gold or silver wares.
2 & 3 Geo. 6. c. 36	Hall-marking of Foreign Plate Act 1939	The Hall-marking of Foreign Plate Act 1939.	The whole act.
14 & 15 Geo. 6. c. 39	Common Informers Act 1951	The Common Informers Act 1951.	In the Schedule, the entries relating to 8 & 9 Will. 3. c. 8; 12 Geo. 2. c. 26; 15 Geo. 2. c. 20; 13 Geo. 3. c. 52; 28 Geo. 3. c. 7; and 38 Geo. 3. c.69.
15 & 16 Geo. 6 & 1 Eliz. 2. c. 44	Customs and Excise Act 1952	The Customs and Excise Act 1952.	In Schedule 10, in Part II, paragraphs 1, 2 and 6.
Acts of Parliament of Ireland
1 Geo. 3. c. 9 (I)	Gold and Silver Thread Act (Ireland) 1761	The Gold and Silver Thread Act (Ireland) 1761.	The whole act.
23 & 24 Geo. 3. c. 23 (I)	Plate Assay Act 1783	An Act to regulate the assay of gold and promote the manufacture of gold and silver wares in this kingdom.	The whole act.

==== Part II: Local Acts ====
Part II — Local Acts
Citation	Short title	Extent of repeal
13 Geo. 3. c. 52	Plate (Sheffield and Birmingham) Act 1772	Sections 4, 5, 9, 10, 11, 12, 13, 14, 15, 16, 17, 19, 20, 21, 22, 23, 25 and 26.
24 Geo. 3. Sess. 2. c. 20	Plate Assay (Sheffield) Act 1784	The whole act.
59 Geo. 3. c. xxviii	Glasgow Assay Office Act 1819	The whole act.
5 Geo. 4. c. lii	Birmingham Assay Office Act 1824	Sections 16, 17, 18, 19, 20, 21, 22, 23, 24, 27, 28, 29, 31, 32, 35, 36, 37, 38, 39, 40 and 41.
6 Edw. 7. c. ix	Sheffield Assay Act 1906	Section 6.
8 & 9 Geo. 5. c. lxi	Sheffield Corporation (Consolidation) Act 1918	Sections 501 and 502.
16 & 17 Geo. 5. c. cx	Glasgow Goldsmiths Company Order Confirmation Act 1926	The whole act.
