= Duties on Bricks Act 1839 =

Act of the Parliament of the United Kingdom

- Act of Parliament
- Parliament of the United Kingdom
- Long title: An Act to repeal the Duties and Drawbacks of Excise on Bricks, and to grant other Duties and Drawbacks in lieu thereof, and to consolidate and amend the Laws for collecting and paying the said Duties and Drawbacks.
- Citation: 2 & 3 Vict. c. 24
- Territorial extent: United Kingdom

Dates
- Royal assent: 19 July 1839
- Commencement: 29 August 1839 (Note: Section 25.)
- Repealed: 17 May 1850
Other legislation
Amends	See § Repealed enactments
Repeals/revokes	See § Repealed enactments
Repealed by	Brick Duties Repeal Act 1850
Relates to	Duties on Paper Act 1839; Duties on Glass Act 1839

Status: Repealed

Text of statute as originally enacted

The Duties on Bricks Act 1839 (2 & 3 Vict. c. 24) was an act of the Parliament of the United Kingdom that consolidated enactments related to duties on bricks in the United Kingdom.

== Provisions ==
=== Repealed enactments ===
Section 1 of the act repealed 5 enactments, listed in that section.

Citation	Short title	Description	Extent of repeal
24 Geo. 3. Sess. 2	Duties on Bricks and Tiles Act 1784	An Act passed in the Second Session of Parliament in the Twenty-fourth Year of the Reign of His late Majesty King George the Third, intituled An Act for granting to His Majesty certain Rates and Duties upon Bricks and Tiles made in Great Britain, and for laying additional Duties on Bricks and Tiles imported into the same ; an Act passed in the Twenty-fifth Year of the Reign of His said late Majesty King George the Third, intituled An Act to explain and amend an Act made in the Twenty-fourth Year of the Reign of His present Majesty, intituled ' An Act for granting to His Majesty certain Rates and Duties upon Bricks and Tiles made in Great Britain, and for laying additional Duties on Bricks and Tiles imported into the same'.	The whole act.
34 Geo. 3. c. 15	Duties on Bricks and Tiles Act 1794	An Act passed in the Thirty-fourth Year of the Reign of His said late Majesty, intituled An Act for granting to His Majesty certain additional Duties on Bricks and Tiles made in or imported into Great Britain.	The whole act.
43 Geo. 3. c. 69	Excise Act 1803	An Act passed in the Forty-third Year of the Reign of His said lateMajesty, intituled An Act to repeal the Duties of Excise payable in Great Britain, and to grant other Duties in lieu thereof.	As grants any Duty or Drawback on Bricks, or relates to the Collection or Management of such Duty.
45 Geo. 3. c. 30	Excise Act 1805	An Act passed in the Forty-fifth Year of the Reign of His said late Majesty, intituled An Act for granting to His Majesty several additional Duties of Excise in Great Britain.	As grants any Duty or Drawback on Bricks, or relates to the Collection or Management of such Duties.
7 Geo. 4. c. 49	Excise (Ireland) Act 1826	An Act passed in the Seventh Year of the Reign of His late Majesty King George the Fourth, intituled An Act to amend several Laws of Excise relating to Bonds on Excise Licences in Ireland, Tiles and Bricks for draining, Oaths on Exportation of Goods, Permits for the Removal of Tea in Ireland, Size of Casks in which Spirits may be warehoused in Scotland and Ireland, the Allowance of Duty on Starch and Soap used in certain Manufactures, and the Repayment ofMoney advanced by Collectors of Excise for Public Works in Ireland.	As relates to the Duty on Bricks.

== Subsequent developments ==
The whole act was repealed by section 1 of the Brick Duties Repeal Act 1850 (13 & 14 Vict. c. 9), which came into force on 17 May 1850.
