= Duties on Paper Act 1839 =

Act of the Parliament of the United Kingdom

- Act of Parliament
- Parliament of the United Kingdom
- Long title: An Act to consolidate and amend the Laws for collecting and securing the Duties of Excise on Paper made in the United Kingdom.
- Citation: 2 & 3 Vict. c. 23
- Territorial extent: United Kingdom

Dates
- Royal assent: 19 July 1839
- Commencement: 11 October 1839 (Note: Section 68.)
- Repealed: 9 August 1874
Other legislation
Amends	See § Repealed enactments
Repeals/revokes	See § Repealed enactments
Repealed by	Statute Law Revision Act 1874 (No. 2)
Relates to	Duties on Bricks Act 1839; Duties on Glass Act 1839

Status: Repealed

Text of statute as originally enacted

The Duties on Paper Act 1839 (2 & 3 Vict. c. 23) was an act of the Parliament of the United Kingdom.

== Provisions ==
=== Repealed enactments ===
Section 67 of the act repealed 13 enactments, listed in that section.

Citation	Short title	Description	Extent of repeal
10 Ann. c. 18 (Note: This is the citation in The Statutes of the Realm.)	Taxation Act 1711	An Act passed in the Tenth Year of the Reign of Her Majesty Queen Anne, intituled An Act for laying several Duties upon all Sope and Paper made in Great Britain, or imported into the same, and upon chequered and striped Linens imported, and upon certain Silks, Callicoes, Linens, and Stuff's printed, painted, or stained, and upon several Kinds of stampt Vellum, Parchment, and Paper, and upon certain printed Papers, Pamphlets, and Advertisements ; for raising the Sum of Eighteen hundred thousand Pounds, by way of a Lottery, towards Her Majesty's Supply; and for licensing an additional Number of Hackney Chairs; and for charging certain Stocks of Cards and Dice; and for better securing Her Majesty's Duties to arise in the Office for the Stamp Duties by Licenses for Marriages and otherwise; and for Relief of Per- sons who have not claimed their Lottery Tickets in due Time, or have lost Exchequer Bills or Lottery Tickets; and for borrowing Money upon Stock (Part of the Capital of the South Sea Company) for the Use of the Public.	As relates to the Duties, Allowances, or Drawbacks on Paper, Button-board, Mill-board, Paste-board, or Scale-board, or the collecting or securing the same.
21 Geo. 3. c. 24	Paper Duties Act 1781	An Act passed in the Twenty-first Year of the Reign of His Majesty King George the Third, intituled An Act for repealing the present Duties upon Paper, Paste-boards, Mill-boards, and Scale-boards made in Great Britain, and for granting other Duties in lieu thereof.	The whole act.
24 Geo. 3. Sess. 2. c. 18	Paper Duties Act 1784	An Act passed in the Second Session of the Parliament held in the Twenty-fourth Year of the Reign of His Majesty King George the Third, intituled An Act for laying additional Duties upon Paper, Paste-board, Mill- boards, and Scale-boards ; and for ex2plaining certain Doubts respecting the Duties imposed by an Act made in the Twenty-first Year of His present Majesty's Reign, intituled 'An Act for repealing the present Duties upon Paper, Paste-boards, Mill-boards, and Scale-boards made in Great ' Britain, and for granting other Duties in lieu thereof'.	The whole act.
34 Geo. 3. c. 20	Paper Duties Act 1794	An Act passed in the Thirty-fourth Year of the Reign of His Majesty King George the Third, intituled An Act for repealing the Duties on Paper, Paste-board, Mill-board, Scale-board, and Glazed Paper, and for granting other Duties in lieu thereof.	The whole act.
41 Geo. 3. (U.K.) . c. 8	Taxation Act 1801	An Act passed in the Forty-first Year of the Reign of His Majesty King George the Third, intituled An Act for granting to His Majesty certain additional Duties on Paper, Paste-board, Mill-board, and Scale- board made in or imported into Great Britain, and on Tea imported into and sold in Great Britain.	The whole act.
42 Geo. 3. c. 94	Paper Duties Act 1802	An Act passed in the Forty-second Year of the Reign of His Majesty King George the Third, intituled AnAct for repealing certain Duties on Paper, Paste-boards, Mill-boards, Scale-boards, and Glazed Paper imported into or made in Great Britain, and for granting other Duties in lieu thereof.	The whole act.
54 Geo. 3. c. 106	Drawbacks on Paper Act 1814	An Act passed in the Fifty-fourth Year of the Reign of His Majesty King George the Third, intituled An Act to remove Doubts as to the Allowance of Drawbacks upon Bibles and Books of Prayer to the King's Printers under an Act passed in the Thirty-fourth Year of His present Majesty.	The whole act.
54 Geo. 3. c. 153	Drawback on Paper Act 1814	Another Act passed in the same Fifty- fourth Year of the Reign of His said Majesty King George the Third, intituled An Act to regulate the Payment of Drawback on Paper allowed to the Universities in Scotland.	The whole act.
56 Geo. 3. c. 103	Duty on Paper Act 1816	An Act passed in the Fifty-sixth Year of the Reign of His Majesty King George the Third, intituled An Act for further securing the Duties on Paper andPaste-board ; andfor repealing the countervailing Duty upon Paste-board imported from Ireland, and the Drawback upon Paste-board exported, and granting other countervailing Duties and Drawbacks in lieu thereof.	The whole act.
56 Geo. 3. c. 78	Duties on Paper (Ireland) Act 1816	Another Act passed in the same Fifty- sixth Year of the Reign of His said Majesty King George the Third, intituled An Act for the better regulating and securing the Collection of the Duties on Paper in Ireland, and to prevent Frauds therein.	The whole act.
1 Geo. 4. c. 58	Duties on Paper etc. Act 1820	An Act passed in the First Year of the Reign of His Majesty King George the Fourth, intituled An Act for the better securing the Excise Duties on Paper and Paste-board.	The whole act.
5 Geo. 4. c. 55	Duties on Hides, etc. Act 1824	An Act passed in the Fifth Year of the Reign of His Majesty King George the Fourth, intituled An Act to assimilate he Duties and Drawbacks on Hides, Skins, Leather, Parchment, Paper, and Paper Hangings manufactured in Ireland to the Duties and Drawbacks payable on the like Articles in Great Britain; and to equalize the Measures and Weights whereby the Duties of Excise and Customs shall be payable throughout the United Kingdom.	As relates to the Duties, Allowances, and Drawbacks on Paper, Button-board, Mill-board, Scale-board, and Paste-board, or the collecting or securing the same.
6 & 7 Will. 4. c. 52	Excise Act 1836	An Act passed in the Sixth and Seventh Years of the Reign of His late Majesty King William the Fourth, intituled An Act to repeal the Duties and Drawbacks of Excise on Paper printed, painted, or stained in the United Kingdom; and to reduce the Duties, Allowances, and Drawbacks on Paper, Button-board, Mill-board, Paste-board, and Scale-board made in the United Kingdom of the First Class, and to discontinue the Excise Survey on the Manufacturers of certain Articles made from Paper, and on Dealers in and Retailers of Vinegar.	As relates to the Duties on Paper, Button-board, Mill-board, Paste-board, and Scale-board, and the collecting and securing the same.

== Subsequent developments ==
The whole act was repealed by section 1 of, and the schedule to, the Statute Law Revision Act 1874 (No. 2) (37 & 38 Vict. c. 96), which came into force on 9 August 1844.
