= Customs Tariff Act 1876 =

Act of the Parliament of the United Kingdom

Customs Tariff Act 1876 (Note: Section 7.)
- Act of Parliament
- Parliament of the United Kingdom
- Long title: An Act for consolidating the Duties of Customs.
- Citation: 39 & 40 Vict. c. 35
- Territorial extent: United Kingdom

Dates
- Royal assent: 24 July 1876
- Commencement: 24 July 1876 (Note: Section 7.)
- Repealed: 27 July 1971 (Note: The Acts of Parliament (Commencement) Act 1793.)
Other legislation
Amended by	Statute Law Revision Act 1883; Customs and Inland Revenue Act 1890
Repealed by	Statute Law (Repeals) Act 1971
Relates to	Customs Consolidation Act 1876

Status: Repealed

Text of statute as originally enacted

The Customs Tariff Act 1876 (39 & 40 Vict. c. 35) was an act of the Parliament of the United Kingdom that consolidated enactments related to customs tariffs in the United Kingdom.

The act was passed on the same day as the Customs Consolidation Act 1876 (39 & 40 Vict. c. 36), which consolidated the customs laws; the two acts together restated the law of customs, the earlier act dealing with the duties themselves and the later act with their management and collection.

== Subsequent developments ==
The entries in the schedule to the act relating to manufactured and unmanufactured tobacco were repealed by section 1 of, and the schedule to, the Statute Law Revision Act 1878 (46 & 47 Vict. c. 39), which came into force on 25 August 1883.

Sections 3 to 6 of the act were repealed by section 36 of the Customs and Inland Revenue Act 1890 (53 & 54 Vict. c. 8), which came into force on 9 June 1890.

The whole act was repealed by section 1 of, and part IX of the schedule to, the Statute Law (Repeals) Act 1971, which came into force on 27 July 1971.
