= Customs and Inland Revenue Act 1890 =

Act of the Parliament of the United Kingdom

Customs and Inland Revenue Act 1890 (Note: Section 1.)
- Act of Parliament
- Parliament of the United Kingdom
- Long title: An Act to grant certain Duties of Customs and Inland Revenue, to repeal and alter other Duties, and to amend the Laws relating to Customs and Inland Revenue.
- Citation: 53 & 54 Vict. c. 8
- Territorial extent: United Kingdom

Dates
- Royal assent: 9 June 1890
- Commencement: 9 June 1890 (Note: The Acts of Parliament (Commencement) Act 1793.)
- Repealed: 2 May 1986
Other legislation
| Amends | See § Repealed enactments |
| Repeals/revokes | See § Repealed enactments |
| Amended by | Hallmarking Act 1973 |
| Repealed by | Statute Law (Repeals) Act 1986 |

Status: Repealed

Text of statute as originally enacted

The Customs and Inland Revenue Act 1890 (53 & 54 Vict. c. 8) was an act of the Parliament of the United Kingdom that granted duties of customs and inland revenue for the year beginning 6 April 1890 and abolished the duties on gold and silver plate in the United Kingdom.

== Provisions ==
The act was divided into five parts. Part I (sections 2 to 9) dealt with customs and excise, including the duties on tea, currants and spirits. Part II (sections 10 to 17) repealed the duties on plate and made provision for an allowance to licensed dealers in respect of silver plate held in stock. Part III (sections 18 to 21) dealt with stamps, Part IV (sections 22 to 30) with income tax and inhabited house duty, and Part V (sections 31 to 35) with methylated spirits.

Section 10 of the act provided that, on and after 1 May 1890, the stamp duties and duties of customs on plate of gold and plate of silver were to cease to be payable and the drawback upon the exportation of plate was to cease to be allowed. The duty mark struck by the assay offices to denote payment of the duty was accordingly discontinued from that date.

=== Repealed enactments ===
Section 36 of the act repealed 16 enactments, listed in the second schedule to the act.

| Citation | Short title | Description | Extent of repeal |
|---|---|---|---|
| 31 Geo. 2. c. 32 | Plate (Duty on Dealer's Licence) Act 1757 | An Act for repealing the duty granted by an Act made in the sixth year of the reign of His late Majesty, on silver plate made, wrought, touched, assayed, or marked in Great Britain; and for granting a duty on licences to be taken out by all persons dealing in gold or silver plate; and for discontinuing all drawbacks upon silver plate exported; and for more effectually preventing frauds and abuses in the marking or stamping of gold or silver plate. | The whole act. |
| 32 Geo. 2. c. 24 | Plate (Duty on Dealer's Licence) Act 1758 | An Act to amend an Act made in the last session of Parliament, for repealing the duty granted by an Act made in the sixth year of the reign of His late Majesty on silver plate; and for granting a duty on licences to be taken out by all persons dealing in gold or silver plate, by permitting the sale of gold or silver plate in small quantities without licence; and by granting a duty instead of the duty now payable upon licences to be taken out by certain dealers in gold or silver plate; and also a duty upon licences to be taken out by pawnbrokers dealing in gold or silver plate, and refiners of gold or silver. | The whole act. |
| 24 Geo. 3. Sess. 2. c. 53 | Plate Duties Act 1784 | An Act for granting to His Majesty certain duties on all gold and silver plate imported; and also certain duties on all gold and silver wrought plate made in Great Britain. | The whole act. |
| 25 Geo. 3. c. 64 | Plate (Duties, Drawbacks) Act 1785 | An Act for altering and amending an Act, made in the last session of Parliament, intituled An Act for granting to His Majesty certain duties on all gold and silver plate imported, and also certain duties on all gold and silver wrought plate made in Great Britain. | The whole act. |
| 52 Geo. 3. c. 59 | Plate (Drawback on Exportation) Act 1812 | An Act for allowing on the exportation of manufactured plate, for the private use of persons residing or going to reside abroad, the same drawback as is now allowed on the exportation of such plate by way of merchandize. | The whole act. |
| 55 Geo. 3. c. 185 | Plate Duties Act 1815 | An Act for repealing the stamp office duties on advertisements, almanacks, newspapers, gold and silver plate, stage coaches, and licences for keeping stage coaches now payable in Great Britain; and for granting new duties in lieu thereof. | The whole act. |
| 1 Geo. 4. c. 14 | Gold Plate (Exportation) Act 1820 | An Act to repeal the drawback on certain gold articles exported, and to permit the exportation of cordage, entitled to bounty, free from right of pre-emption by the commissioners of the navy. | The whole act. |
| 4 & 5 Vict. c. 56 | Substitution of Punishments for Death Act 1841 | An Act for taking away the punishment of death in certain cases, and substituting other punishment in lieu thereof. | The whole act. |
| 7 & 8 Vict. c. 22 | Gold and Silver Wares Act 1844 | An Act to amend the laws now in force for preventing frauds and abuses in the marking of gold and silver wares in England. | Section five in part, namely, from " and the duty " to " thereof," and from " and to receive " to " thereto only," and section ten from the second " or where " to the last " duties." |
| 12 & 13 Vict. c. 80 | Stamps Act 1849 | An Act to repeal the allowances on the purchase of stamps and for the receiving and accounting for the duties on gold and silver plate, and to grant other allowances in lieu thereof. | The whole act. |
| 17 & 18 Vict. c. 96 | Gold and Silver Wares Act 1854 | An Act for allowing gold wares to be manufactured at a lower standard than that now allowed by law, and to amend the law relating to the assaying of gold and silver wares. | Section three. |
| 29 & 30 Vict. c. 64 | Inland Revenue Act 1866 | An Act to amend the laws relating to the Inland Revenue. | Section fifteen. |
| 39 & 40 Vict. c. 35 | Customs Tariff Act 1876 | The Customs Tariff Act, 1876. | So much of section one and the schedule as relate to the duties upon plate, and sections three to six. |
| 43 & 44 Vict. c. 24 | Spirits Act 1880 | The Spirits Act, 1880. | Section one hundred and twenty-three in part, namely, the words " in an excise warehouse " in subsection two. |
| 46 & 47 Vict. c. 55 | Revenue Act 1883 | The Revenue Act, 1883. | Section ten in part, namely, from after the first " customs " to " duty " in subsection two, the words " the duty and " in subsection four, the words " free of duty " in subsection seven, and the sentence commencing " Where " in subsection ten. |
| 47 & 48 Vict. c. 62 | Revenue Act 1884 | The Revenue Act, 1884. | Section four in part, namely, from " subject " to " customs." |

== Subsequent developments ==
Section 17 of the act was repealed by section 23 of, and part I of schedule 7 to, the Hallmarking Act 1973, which came into force on 1 January 1975.

The whole act was repealed by section 1(1) of, and part III of schedule 1 to, the Statute Law (Repeals) Act 1986, which came into force on 2 May 1986.
