= Window tax =

Property tax based on the number of windows in a house

Window tax was a property tax based on the number of windows in a house. It was a significant social, cultural, and architectural force in England, Scotland, France and Ireland during the 18th and 19th centuries. To avoid the tax, some houses from the period can be seen to have bricked-up window-spaces for the purpose of (re)glazing after the repeal of the tax. In England and Wales it was introduced in 1696 and in Scotland from 1748. It was repealed in both cases in 1851. In France it was established in 1798 and was repealed in 1926.

== History ==
The tax was introduced in England and Wales in 1696 under King William III, by the Taxation (No. 3) Act 1695 (7 & 8 Will. 3. c. 18), and was designed to impose tax relative to the prosperity of the taxpayer, but without the controversy that then surrounded the idea of income tax.

At that time, many people in Britain opposed income tax, on principle, because the disclosure of personal income was perceived by them to represent an unacceptable governmental intrusion into private matters, and a potential threat to personal liberty. The first permanent British income tax was not introduced until 1842, and the tax remained controversial into the 20th century.

When the window tax was introduced, it consisted of two parts: a flat-rate house tax of two shillings per house (equivalent to £16.32 in 2025), and a variable tax for the number of windows above ten in the house. Properties with between ten and twenty windows paid an extra four shillings (equivalent to £32.65 in 2025), and those above twenty windows paid an extra eight shillings (equivalent to £65.29 in 2025).

In 1709, with the union of England and Scotland, taxes were harmonised and a new top rate of 20s total was introduced for houses with 30 or more windows. In 1747 the 2s flat rate was detached from the window tax as a tax in its own right and the way the window tax was calculated was altered. 6d was charged for each window in a house with 10–14, 9d for each window in a house with 15–19, 1s for every window in a house with 20 or more. In 1758 the flat rate charge was increased to 3s. The number of windows that incurred tax was changed to seven in 1766 and eight in 1825.

The flat-rate tax was changed to a variable rate, dependent on the property value, in 1778. People who were exempt from paying church or poor rates, for reasons of poverty, were exempt from the window tax. Window tax was relatively unintrusive and easy to assess. An example was Manchester Royal Infirmary which had to pay a tax of 1/9d per window on the windows of the rooms occupied by staff of the infirmary in 1841—a total of £1 9/9d. Certain rooms, particularly dairies, cheese rooms and milkhouses, were exempt providing they were clearly labelled, and it is not uncommon to find the name of such rooms carved on the lintel. The bigger the house, the more windows it was likely to have, and the more tax the occupants would pay. Nevertheless, the tax was unpopular, because it was seen by some as a tax on "light and air".

In The Wealth of Nations, Adam Smith briefly discussed the window tax as one case among various forms of taxation. Smith observed that the tax was relatively inoffensive because its assessment did not require the assessor to enter the residence—a building's windows could be counted from the outside. On the other hand, Smith reported that others objected to the tax on the grounds of its inequality, since it was thought to have a disproportionate impact on the poor. Smith himself observed that the tax's effect was to lower rent.

In Scotland, a window tax was imposed after 1748. A house had to have at least seven windows or a rent of at least £5 to be taxed. Windows that have been filled with masonry may have no connection to taxation, but reflect the location of staircases, fireplaces or for purposes of maintaining the symmetry of a building facade.

In Ireland, the tax was introduced in 1799 and was not repealed until 1851. Similarly, a glass tax was introduced in 1825 and remained in place until 1845.

A similar tax also existed in France from 1798 to 1926.

There was a strong agitation in England in favour of the abolition of the tax during the winter of 1850–51, and it was accordingly repealed on 24 July 1851, and a tax on inhabited houses substituted. The Scottish and Irish window taxes were abolished at the same time.

The saying "daylight robbery" is popularly believed to originate with the window tax, but there appears to be no scholarly support for this. Another associated idea is that the tax inspired Europeans to begin using bricked-up windows, although this is most likely untrue, as blind windows were used for aesthetic purposes since at least the medieval period, such as on the Church of Saint John the Baptist, Kerch, Crimea, built in 757 AD. Windows were also bricked up in Europe from the 1600s to avoid taxes.

== See also ==
- Bedroom tax
- Brick tax
- Glass tax
- Hearth tax
- Wallpaper tax
