= Brick Duties Repeal Act 1850 =

Act of the Parliament of the United Kingdom

- Act of Parliament
- Parliament of the United Kingdom
- Long title: An Act to repeal the Duties and Drawbacks of Excise on Bricks.
- Citation: 13 & 14 Vict. c. 9
- Territorial extent: United Kingdom

Dates
- Royal assent: 17 May 1850
- Commencement: 17 May 1850 (Note: The Acts of Parliament (Commencement) Act 1793.)
- Repealed: 11 August 1875
Other legislation
Repeals/revokes	Duties on Bricks Act 1839
Repealed by	Statute Law Revision Act 1875

Status: Repealed

Text of statute as originally enacted

The Brick Duties Repeal Act 1850 (13 & 14 Vict. c. 9) was an act of the Parliament of the United Kingdom that repealed the excise duties and drawbacks on bricks in the United Kingdom.

== Provisions ==
Section 1 of the act repealed the Duties on Bricks Act 1839 (2 & 3 Vict. c. 24), except in so far as that enactment repealed earlier enactments, and in so far as it related to duties and drawbacks charged, incurred or payable before the act was passed and to fines, penalties and forfeitures in respect of them, which were to be sued for, recovered, levied, paid and applied as if the act had not been passed.

Section 2 of the act provided for a drawback, equal to half of the duty charged, on sound bricks held by makers at the time the act was passed.

Section 3 of the act required makers and sellers of bricks to abate the price under existing contracts, from 27 March 1850, by an amount equivalent to the duty from which the brick was relieved.

Section 4 of the act provided that the act could be amended or repealed by any act passed in the same session of parliament.

== Subsequent developments ==
The whole act was repealed by section 1 of, and the schedule to, the Statute Law Revision Act 1875 (38 & 39 Vict. c. 66), which came into force on 11 August 1875.
