= List of acts of the Parliament of Great Britain from 1784 =

This is a complete list of acts of the Parliament of Great Britain for the year 1784.

For acts passed until 1707, see the list of acts of the Parliament of England and the list of acts of the Parliament of Scotland. See also the list of acts of the Parliament of Ireland.

For acts passed from 1801 onwards, see the list of acts of the Parliament of the United Kingdom. For acts of the devolved parliaments and assemblies in the United Kingdom, see the list of acts of the Scottish Parliament, the list of acts of the Northern Ireland Assembly, and the list of acts and measures of Senedd Cymru; see also the list of acts of the Parliament of Northern Ireland.

The number shown after each act's title is its chapter number. Acts are cited using this number, preceded by the year(s) of the reign during which the relevant parliamentary session was held; thus the Union with Ireland Act 1800 is cited as "39 & 40 Geo. 3. c. 67", meaning the 67th act passed during the session that started in the 39th year of the reign of George III and which finished in the 40th year of that reign. Note that the modern convention is to use Arabic numerals in citations (thus "41 Geo. 3" rather than "41 Geo. III"). Acts of the last session of the Parliament of Great Britain and the first session of the Parliament of the United Kingdom are both cited as "41 Geo. 3".

Acts passed by the Parliament of Great Britain did not have a short title; however, some of these acts have subsequently been given a short title by acts of the Parliament of the United Kingdom (such as the Short Titles Act 1896).

Before the Acts of Parliament (Commencement) Act 1793 came into force on 8 April 1793, acts passed by the Parliament of Great Britain were deemed to have come into effect on the first day of the session in which they were passed. Because of this, the years given in the list below may in fact be the year before a particular act was passed.

== 24 Geo. 3. Sess. 2 ==
The first session of the 16th Parliament of Great Britain, which met from 18 May 1784 until 20 August 1784.

This session was also traditionally cited as 24 Geo. 3. sess. 2, 24 Geo. 3. Stat. 2, 24 Geo. 3. stat. 2, 24 Geo. 3. St. 2, 24 Geo. 3. st. 2, 24 G. 3. Sess. 2, 24 G. 3. sess. 2, 24 G. 3. Stat. 2, 24 G. 3. stat. 2, 24 G. 3. St. 2 or 24 G. 3. st. 2.

=== Public acts ===
Short title	Citation	Royal assent
Long title
Trade with America Act 1784 (repealed)	24 Geo. 3. Sess. 2. c. 1	18 June 1784
An Act for further continuing for a limited Time, an Act made in the Twenty-third Year of the Reign of His present Majesty, intituled, "An Act for preventing certain Instruments from being required, from Ships belonging to the United States of America, and to give to His Majesty, for a limited Time, certain Powers, for the better carrying on Trade and Commerce, between the Subjects of His Majesty's Dominions and the Inhabitants of the said United States." (Note: Trade with America (No. 2) Act 1783 (23 Geo. 3. c. 39)) (Repealed by Statute Law Revision Act 1871 (34 & 35 Vict. c. 116))
East India Company (No. 1) Act 1784 (repealed)	24 Geo. 3. Sess. 2. c. 2	29 June 1784
An Act to empower the East India Company to make a Dividend to the Proprietors of East India, Stock, at Midsummer, One thousand seven hundred and eighty-four. (Repealed by Statute Law Revision Act 1871 (34 & 35 Vict. c. 116))
Woollen Manufactures, Suffolk Act 1784 (repealed)	24 Geo. 3. Sess. 2. c. 3	16 July 1784
An Act for more effectually preventing Frauds and Abuses, committed by Persons employed in the Manufactures of combing Wool, Worsted Yarn, and Goods made from Worsted, in the County of Suffolk. (Repealed by Master and Servant Act 1889 (52 & 53 Vict. c. 24))
Birmingham and Fazeley Canal Act 1784 (repealed)	24 Geo. 3. Sess. 2. c. 4	16 July 1784
An Act for incorporating the Company of Proprietors of a Canal Navigation, authorized by an Act passed in the Eighth Year of the Reign of His present Majesty King George the Third, (Note: Birmingham Canal Navigation Act 1768 (8 Geo. 3. c. 38)) to be made from Birmingham to Bilstone and Autherley, with the Company of Proprietors of a Canal Navigation, authorized by an Act passed in the Twenty-third Year of the Reign of His present Majesty, (Note: Birmingham and Fazeley Canal Act 1783 (23 Geo. 3. c. 92)) to be made from Birmingham to Fazeley; and for consolidating their Shares, and amending the said last-mentioned Act. (Repealed by Birmingham Canal Navigations Act 1835 (5 & 6 Will. 4. c. xxxiv))
Sheffield Market Place Act 1784 (repealed)	24 Geo. 3. Sess. 2. c. 5	16 July 1784
An Act for enlarging the Market Place, and regulating the Markets within the Town of Sheffield, in the West Riding of the County of York, and for widening and rendering more safe and commodious several Streets adjoining or leading into the said Market Place, and for taking down the present Slaughter Houses within the said Town, and erecting others in a more proper Situation. (Repealed by Sheffield Markets Act 1827 (7 & 8 Geo. 4. c. xlvi))
Exercise of Trade by Soldiers, etc. Act 1784 (repealed)	24 Geo. 3. Sess. 2. c. 6	16 July 1784
An Act to enable such Officers, Mariners, and Soldiers as have been in the Land or Sea Service, or in the Marines, or in the Militia, or any Corps of Fencible Men, since the second Year of His present Majesty's Reign, to exercise Trades. (Repealed by Statute Law Revision Act 1871 (34 & 35 Vict. c. 116))
Customs, etc. Act 1784 (repealed)	24 Geo. 3. Sess. 2. c. 7	16 July 1784
An Act for explaining certain Acts of the Parliament of Scotland (Note: Manufactories Act 1661 (c. 280 (S))) (Note: Excise and Customs Act 1669 (c. 18 (S))) (Note: Trade Act 1681 (c. 78 (S))) concerning Manufactories, and for extinguishing the Claims made by the Proprietors of the Two Manufactories, called the Rope and Soap Manufactories of Glasgow, to certain Exemptions from Customs and Duties, and for making Compensation in Lieu thereof. (Repealed by Statute Law Revision Act 1871 (34 & 35 Vict. c. 116))
Postage Act 1784 (repealed)	24 Geo. 3. Sess. 2. c. 8	16 July 1784
An Act for establishing certain Regulations concerning the Portage and Conveyance of Letters and Packets by the Post between Great Britain and Ireland. (Repealed by Post Office (Repeal of Laws) Act 1837 (7 Will. 4 & 1 Vict. c. 32))
Customs Act 1784 (repealed)	24 Geo. 3. Sess. 2. c. 9	16 July 1784
An Act to authorize the Commissioners of the Customs in England and Scotland to cancel Bonds given for the High Duties on certain Parcels of Corn imported into Great Britain, on certain conditions therein mentioned. (Repealed by Statute Law Revision Act 1871 (34 & 35 Vict. c. 116))
National Debt Act 1784 (repealed)	24 Geo. 3. Sess. 2. c. 10	16 July 1784
An Act for raising a certain Sum of Money by Way of Annuities, and for establishing a Lottery. (Repealed by Statute Law Revision Act 1870 (33 & 34 Vict. c. 69))
Duties upon Candles Act 1784 (repealed)	24 Geo. 3. Sess. 2. c. 11	20 July 1784
An Act for laying additional Duties upon all Candles (except Wax and Spermaceti Candles) and for more effectually securing the Duties upon Candles. (Repealed by Statute Law Revision Act 1861 (24 & 25 Vict. c. 101))
Bank of Scotland Act 1784 (repealed)	24 Geo. 3. Sess. 2. c. 12	16 July 1784
An Act to enable the Governor and Company of the Bank of Scotland, further to increase the Capital Stock of the said Company. (Repealed by Statute Law (Repeals) Act 1981 (c. 19))
Audit of Public Accounts Act 1784 (repealed)	24 Geo. 3. Sess. 2. c. 13	20 July 1784
An Act for appointing and enabling Commissioners further to examine, take, and state the Public Accounts of the Kingdom. (Repealed by Statute Law Revision Act 1871 (34 & 35 Vict. c. 116))
Composition for a Crown Debt Act 1784 (repealed)	24 Geo. 3. Sess. 2. c. 14	16 July 1784
An Act to enable the Commissioners of His Majesty's Treasury to compound a Debt due to the Crown from Francis Dixon Esquire, deceased, and his Sureties, and for vesting his Estates in Trustees; and for other Purposes therein mentioned. (Repealed by Statute Law Revision Act 1948 (11 & 12 Geo. 6. c. 62))
Shrewsbury (Poor Relief) Act 1784 (repealed)	24 Geo. 3. Sess. 2. c. 15	16 July 1784
An Act for the better Relief and Employment of the Poor belonging to several Parishes within the Town of Shrewsbury and the Liberties thereof, in the County of Salop. (Repealed by Shrewsbury Poor Relief Act 1826 (7 Geo. 4. c. cxli))
Customs (No. 2) Act 1784 (repealed)	24 Geo. 3. Sess. 2. c. 16	30 July 1784
An Act to discontinue the Petty Custom on Aliens Goods imported into Great Britain, and the Duty of One per Centum on Goods exported to or imported from the Mediterranean Seas in unqualified Ships, and for repealing so much of an Act passed in the Fourth Year of the Reign of His present Majesty, (Note: Sugar Act 1763 (4 Geo. 3. c. 15)) as enacts that no Part of the Old Subsidy shall be drawn back upon Goods exported to the British Colonies or Plantations in America. (Repealed by Statute Law Revision Act 1871 (34 & 35 Vict. c. 116))
Launceston (Poor Relief) Act 1784	24 Geo. 3. Sess. 2. c. 17	30 July 1784
An Act for amending and rendering more effectual, an Act of the Twenty-eighth Year of the Reign of His late Majesty, intituled, "An Act for the better Relief and Employment of the Poor of the Borough of Dunheved otherwise Launceston, and Parish of Saint Mary Magdalen, in the County of Cornwall;" (Note: Launceston Poor Relief Act 1755 (28 Geo. 2. c. 38)) and for vesting the Aftermowth of certain Common Lands within the Borough in Trustees, for the Purposes therein mentioned.
Paper Duties Act 1784 (repealed)	24 Geo. 3. Sess. 2. c. 18	30 July 1784
An Act for laying additional Duties upon Paper, Pasteboards, Millboards, and Scaleboards, and for explaining certain Doubts respecting the Duties imposed by an Act made in the Twenty-first Year of His present Majesty's Reign, intituled, "An Act for repealing the present Duties upon Paper, Pasteboards, Millboards, and Scaleboards made in Great Britain, and for granting other Duties in Lieu thereof." (Note: Paper Duties Act 1781 (21 Geo. 3. c. 24)) (Repealed by Duties on Paper Act 1839 (2 & 3 Vict. c. 23))
Manufacture of Leather Act 1784 (repealed)	24 Geo. 3. Sess. 2. c. 19	30 July 1784
An Act to revive and continue an Act made in the Twelfth Year of the Reign of His present Majesty, (Note: Customs (No. 1) Act 1772 (12 Geo. 3. c. 50)) for encouraging the Manufacture of Leather, by lowering the Duty payable upon the Importation of Oak Bark, when the Price of such Bark shall exceed a certain Rate for a limited Time, (Note: Customs (No. 1) Act 1772 (12 Geo. 3. c. 50)) and for extending several Acts of Parliament, relative to the Manufacture of Leather to that Part of Great Britain called Scotland. (Repealed by Statute Law Revision Act 1871 (34 & 35 Vict. c. 116))
Plate Assay (Sheffield) Act 1784 (repealed)	24 Geo. 3. Sess. 2. c. 20	30 July 1784
An Act for altering and amending an Act, of the Thirteenth Year of the Reign of His present Majesty, intituled, "An Act for appointing Wardens and Assay Masters, for assaying wrought Plate in the Towns of Sheffield and Birmingham;" (Note: Plate Assay (Sheffield and Birmingham) Act 1772 (13 Geo. 3. c. 52)) so far as relates to the said Town of Sheffield. (Repealed by Hallmarking Act 1973 (c. 43))
Hat Manufacture Act 1784 (repealed)	24 Geo. 3. Sess. 2. c. 21	30 July 1784
An Act for the Preservation and Encouragement of the Hat Manufactory within this Realm, by preventing the Exportation of British Hare Skins, British Hare Wool, and British Coney Wool, and all undressed or untawed British Coney Skins, and for preventing any of the said Skins from being stained or dyed, and for the Importation of Goats' Hair into this Kingdom Duty free. (Repealed by Statute Law Revision Act 1871 (34 & 35 Vict. c. 116))
Sale by Lottery of Sir Ashton Lever's Museum Act 1784 (repealed)	24 Geo. 3. Sess. 2. c. 22	30 July 1784
An Act for enabling Sir Ashton Lever to dispose of his Museum as now exhibited at Leicester House, by Way of Chance. (Repealed by Statute Law Revision Act 1948 (11 & 12 Geo. 6. c. 62))
Trade with America (No. 2) Act 1784 (repealed)	24 Geo. 3. Sess. 2. c. 23	30 July 1784
An Act for further continuing for a limited Time, an Act made in the Twenty-third Year of the Reign of His present Majesty, intituled, "An Act for preventing certain Instruments from being required from Ships belonging to the United States of America, and to give to His Majesty for a limited Time certain Powers, for the better carrying on Trade and Commerce between the Subjects of His Majesty's Dominions and the Inhabitants of the said United States." (Repealed by Statute Law Revision Act 1871 (34 & 35 Vict. c. 116))
Duties on Bricks and Tiles Act 1784 (repealed)	24 Geo. 3. Sess. 2. c. 24	13 August 1784
An Act for granting to His Majesty certain Rates and Duties upon Bricks and Tiles made in Great Britain, and for laying additional Duties on Bricks and Tiles imported into the same. (Repealed by Duties on Bricks Act 1839 (2 & 3 Vict. c. 24))
East India Company Act 1784 or the India Act 1784 or Pitt's India Act (repealed)	24 Geo. 3. Sess. 2. c. 25	13 August 1784
An Act for the better Regulation and Management of the Affairs of the East India Company, and of the British Possessions in India, and for establishing a Court of Judicature, for the more speedy and effectual Trial of Persons accused of Offences committed in the East Indies. (Repealed by Government of India (Amendment) Act 1916 (6 & 7 Geo. 5. c. 37))
Recess Elections Act 1784 (repealed)	24 Geo. 3. Sess. 2. c. 26	13 August 1784
An Act to repeal so much of Two Acts made in the Tenth (Note: Recess Elections Act 1770 (10 Geo. 3. c. 41)) and Fifteenth (Note: Parliament Act 1775 (15 Geo. 3. c. 36)) Years of the Reign of His present Majesty, as authorizes the Speaker of the House of Commons to issue his Warrants to the Clerk of the Crown, for making out Writs for the Election of Members to serve in Parliament in the Manner therein mentioned; and for substituting other Provisions for the like Purposes. (Repealed by Recess Elections Act 1975 (c. 66))
Hackney Coaches Act 1784 (repealed)	24 Geo. 3. Sess. 2. c. 27	13 August 1784
An Act for laying an additional Duty on Hackney Coaches, and for explaining and amending several Acts of Parliament relating to Hackney Coaches. (Repealed by London Hackney Carriage Act 1831 (1 & 2 Will. 4. c. 22))
Bounty for Taking L'Amazone Act 1784 (repealed)	24 Geo. 3. Sess. 2. c. 28	13 August 1784
An Act for authorizing the Treasurer of the Navy to pay to the Officers and Men belonging to His Majesty's Ship Santa Margaretta, (Note: HMS Santa Margarita (1779).) the like Bounty for taking the French Frigate called L'Amazone, (Note: French frigate Amazone (1778).) as is allowed to the Officers and Men on board any of His Majesty's Ships of War, taking or destroying Ships of War belonging to the Enemy. (Repealed by Statute Law Revision Act 1871 (34 & 35 Vict. c. 116))
Portsmouth, Plymouth Fortifications Act 1784	24 Geo. 3. Sess. 2. c. 29	13 August 1784
An Act for vesting certain Lands, Tenements, and Hereditaments in Trustees, for better securing His Majesty's Docks, Ships, and Stores at Portsmouth and Plymouth; and also for re-vesting certain Messuages, Lands, Tenements, and Hereditaments in the Counties of Southampton, Cornwall, and Devon, in the former Proprietors thereof, and for other Purposes therein mentioned.
Licences for Retailing Beer, etc. Act 1784 (repealed)	24 Geo. 3. Sess. 2. c. 30	13 August 1784
An Act for granting to His Majesty an additional Duty upon Licences for retailing Beer, Ale, and other exciseable Liquors. (Repealed by Statute Law Revision Act 1861 (24 & 25 Vict. c. 101))
Duties on Horses Act 1784 (repealed)	24 Geo. 3. Sess. 2. c. 31	13 August 1784
An Act for granting to His Majesty certain Duties on Horses kept for the Purpose of Riding, and on Horses used in Drawing certain Carriages, in respect whereof any Duty of Excise is made payable. (Repealed by House Tax Act 1803 (43 Geo. 3. c. 161))
Bank of England Act 1784 (repealed)	24 Geo. 3. Sess. 2. c. 32	13 August 1784
An Act to postpone the Payment of the Sum of Two Millions, advanced by the Governor and Company of the Bank of England, towards the Supply for the Service of the Year One thousand seven hundred and eighty-one. (Repealed by Statute Law Revision Act 1870 (33 & 34 Vict. c. 69))
Loans or Exchequer Bills Act 1784 (repealed)	24 Geo. 3. Sess. 2. c. 33	13 August 1784
An Act for raising a certain Sum of Money by Loans or Exchequer Bills, for the Service of the Year One thousand seven hundred and eighty-four. (Repealed by Statute Law Revision Act 1871 (34 & 35 Vict. c. 116))
East India Company (No. 3) Act 1784 (repealed)	24 Geo. 3. Sess. 2. c. 34	19 August 1784
An Act for the Relief of the East India Company, with respect to the Payment of certain Sums due to the Public; and to the Acceptance of certain Bills drawn upon the said Company; and for regulating the Dividends to be made by the said Company. (Repealed by Statute Law Revision Act 1861 (24 & 25 Vict. c. 101))
Ordination of Aliens Act 1784 (repealed)	24 Geo. 3. Sess. 2. c. 35	13 August 1784
An Act to empower the Bishop of London for the Time being, or any other Bishop to be by Him appointed, to admit to the Order of Deacon or Priest, Persons, being Subjects or Citizens of Countries out of His Majesty's Dominions, without requiring them to take the Oath of Allegiance, as appointed by Law. (Repealed by Overseas and Other Clergy (Ministry and Ordination) Measure 1967 (No. 3))
Duties on Candles Act 1784 (repealed)	24 Geo. 3. Sess. 2. c. 36	19 August 1784
An Act for repealing the present Duties upon Wax Candles made in Great Britain; and for granting in Lieu thereof other Duties upon Wax Candles made in Great Britain, and upon Wax imported, and upon Licences to make or sell Wax Candles in Great Britain. (Repealed by Statute Law Revision Act 1861 (24 & 25 Vict. c. 101))
National Debt (No. 2) Act 1784 (repealed)	24 Geo. 3. Sess. 2. c. 37	20 August 1784
An Act for granting to His Majesty certain additional Rates of Postage, for Conveyance of Letters and Packets by the Post, within the Kingdom of Great Britain, for preventing Frauds in the Revenue, carried on by the Conveyance of certain Goods in Letters and Packets, and for further preventing Frauds and Abuses, in relation to the sending and receiving of Letters and Packets, free from Postage. (Repealed by Statute Law Revision Act 1870 (33 & 34 Vict. c. 69))
Commutation Act 1784 or the Taxation Act 1784 (repealed)	24 Geo. 3. Sess. 2. c. 38	20 August 1784
An Act for repealing the several Duties on Tea, and for granting to His Majesty other Duties in Lieu thereof, and also several Duties on inhabited Houses, and upon the Importation of Cocoa-Nuts and Coffee, and for repealing the Inland Duties of Excise thereon. (Repealed by Statute Law Revision Act 1861 (24 & 25 Vict. c. 101))
National Debt (No. 3) Act 1784 (repealed)	24 Geo. 3. Sess. 2. c. 39	19 August 1784
An Act for granting Annuities to satisfy certain Navy, Victualling, and Transport Bills and Ordnance Debentures. (Repealed by Statute Law Revision Act 1870 (33 & 34 Vict. c. 69))
Duties on Linens Act 1784 (repealed)	24 Geo. 3. Sess. 2. c. 40	19 August 1784
An Act for granting to His Majesty additional Duties on Linens, printed, painted, stained, or dyed in Great Britain; and for granting certain Duties on Cotton Stuffs bleached or dyed in Great Britain; and on Licences for bleaching or dyeing the same; and upon the Importation of Stuffs made of, or mixed with Cotton, not painted, printed, stained, or dyed in Foreign Parts. (Repealed by Statute Law Revision Act 1861 (24 & 25 Vict. c. 101))
Duties on Certain Licences Act 1784 (repealed)	24 Geo. 3. Sess. 2. c. 41	19 August 1784
An Act for laying certain Duties upon Licences to be taken out by the Makers of, and Dealers in exciseable Commodities, therein mentioned. (Repealed by Statute Law Revision Act 1861 (24 & 25 Vict. c. 101))
Pawnbrokers Act 1784 (repealed)	24 Geo. 3. Sess. 2. c. 42	20 August 1784
An Act to explain, amend, and render more effectual, an Act made in the Thirtieth Year of the Reign of His late Majesty King George the Second, intituled, "An Act for the more effectual Punishment of Persons who shall attain, or attempt to attain Possession of Goods or Money by false or untrue Pretences; for preventing the unlawful Pawning of Goods; for the easy Redemption of Goods pawned; and for preventing Gaming in Public Houses, by Journeymen, Labourers, Servants, and Apprentices," (Note: Obtaining Money by False Pretences, etc. Act 1757 (30 Geo. 2. c. 24)) so far as the same relates to the preventing the unlawful pawning of Goods, and for the easy Redemption of Goods pawned. (Repealed by Statute Law Revision Act 1871 (34 & 35 Vict. c. 116))
Game Certificates Act 1784 (repealed)	24 Geo. 3. Sess. 2. c. 43	20 August 1784
An Act for granting to His Majesty certain Duties on Certificates issued, with respect to the killing of Game. (Repealed by Statute Law Revision Act 1861 (24 & 25 Vict. c. 101))
Appropriation Act 1784 (repealed)	24 Geo. 3. Sess. 2. c. 44	19 August 1784
An Act for granting to His Majesty a certain Sum of Money out of the Sinking Fund, and for applying certain Monies therein mentioned for the Service of the Year One thousand seven hundred and eighty-four, for appropriating the Monies arising by the Duties on Malt, Mum, Cyder, and Perry; and also by a Land Tax granted to His Majesty by Two Acts made in the last Session of Parliament; (Note: Land Tax Act 1783 (23 Geo. 3. c. 3)) (Note: Malt Duties Act 1783 (23 Geo. 3. c. 4)) and for further appropriating the Supplies granted in this Session of Parliament. (Repealed by Statute Law Revision Act 1871 (34 & 35 Vict. c. 116))
Trade with British America Act 1784 (repealed)	24 Geo. 3. Sess. 2. c. 45	19 August 1784
An Act to extend the Powers of an Act made in the Twenty-third Year of His present Majesty, for giving His Majesty certain Powers for the better carrying on Trade and Commerce between the Subjects of His Majesty's Dominions and the Inhabitants of the United States of America, to the Trade and Commerce of this Kingdom with the British Colonies and Plantations in America, with respect to certain Articles therein mentioned. (Repealed by Statute Law Revision Act 1871 (34 & 35 Vict. c. 116))
Duties on Spirits Act 1784 (repealed)	24 Geo. 3. Sess. 2. c. 46	19 August 1784
An Act to discontinue, for a limited Time, the Payment of the Duties upon Low Wines and Spirits for Home Consumption; and for granting and securing the due Payment of other Duties in Lieu thereof; and for the better Regulation of the making and vending British Spirits, as well for Home Consumption as for Exportation; and for destroying all Home-made and foreign Spirits, after the Condemnation thereof; and for vesting in His Majesty the Duties of Excise within the Lands of Ferentosh, in the County of Inverness; and for discontinuing, for a limited Time, certain Imposts and Duties upon Rum and Spirits imported from the West Indies. (Repealed by Statute Law Revision Act 1861 (24 & 25 Vict. c. 101))
Smuggling Act 1784 (repealed)	24 Geo. 3. Sess. 2. c. 47	19 August 1784
An Act for the more effectual Prevention of Smuggling in this Kingdom. (Repealed by Customs Law Repeal Act 1825 (6 Geo. 4. c. 105))
Duties on Starch and Soap Act 1784 (repealed)	24 Geo. 3. Sess. 2. c. 48	19 August 1784
An Act for better securing the Duties on Starch and Soap. (Repealed by Statute Law Revision Act 1861 (24 & 25 Vict. c. 101))
Customs (No. 3) Act 1784 (repealed)	24 Geo. 3. Sess. 2. c. 49	20 August 1784
An Act for granting additional Duties upon Raw and thrown Silk imported into Great Britain, and upon Lead exported from Great Britain into Parts beyond the Seas, and for allowing a Drawback upon the Exportation of Silks, and Stuffs mixed with Silk. (Repealed by Statute Law Revision Act 1861 (24 & 25 Vict. c. 101))
Exportation, etc. Act 1784 (repealed)	24 Geo. 3. Sess. 2. c. 50	19 August 1784
An Act to revive and continue several Laws relating to allowing the Exportation of certain Quantities of Wheat, and other Articles, to His Majesty's Sugar Colonies in America; and to the allowing a Drawback of the Duties on Rum, shipped as Stores, to be consumed on board Merchant Ships on their Voyages; and to extend the Provisions of an Act of the Twenty-third Year of His present Majesty, (Note: Duties on Wines, etc. Act 1783 (23 Geo. 3. c. 76)) relative to the Removal of Wine in Casks to Wine removed in Bottles and other Packages. (Repealed by Statute Law Revision Act 1871 (34 & 35 Vict. c. 116))
Hat Duties, etc. Act 1784 (repealed)	24 Geo. 3. Sess. 2. c. 51	19 August 1784
An Act for granting to His Majesty certain Duties on Licences to be taken out by Persons vending Hats by Retail; and also certain Duties on Hats sold under such Licences; and for laying additional Duties on all Hats and Caps imported into this Kingdom. (Repealed by Statute Law Revision Act 1861 (24 & 25 Vict. c. 101))
Loans or Exchequer Bills (No. 2) Act 1784 (repealed)	24 Geo. 3. Sess. 2. c. 52	19 August 1784
An Act for raising a further Sum of Money by Loans or Exchequer Bills, for the Service of the Year One thousand seven hundred and eighty-four. (Repealed by Statute Law Revision Act 1871 (34 & 35 Vict. c. 116))
Plate Duties Act 1784 (repealed)	24 Geo. 3. Sess. 2. c. 53	19 August 1784
An Act for granting to His Majesty certain Duties on all Gold and Silver Plate imported; and also certain Duties on all Gold and Silver wrought Plate made in Great Britain. (Repealed by Customs and Inland Revenue Act 1890 (53 & 54 Vict. c. 8))
Gaols Act 1784 (repealed)	24 Geo. 3. Sess. 2. c. 54	19 August 1784
An Act to explain and amend an Act made in the Eleventh and Twelfth Years of the Reign of King William the Third, intituled, "An Act to enable Justices of Peace to build and repair Gaols in their respective Counties;" (Note: Gaols Act 1698 (11 Will. 3. c. 19)) and for other Purposes therein mentioned. (Repealed by Statute Law Revision Act 1861 (24 & 25 Vict. c. 101))
Houses of Correction Act 1784 (repealed)	24 Geo. 3. Sess. 2. c. 55	19 August 1784
An Act to explain and amend an Act made in the Twenty-second Year of the Reign of His present Majesty, intituled, "An Act for the amending and rendering more effectual, the Laws in being relative to Houses of Correction." (Note: Houses of Correction Act 1782 (22 Geo. 3. c. 64)) (Repealed by Statute Law Revision Act 1861 (24 & 25 Vict. c. 101))
Transportation, etc. Act 1784 (repealed)	24 Geo. 3. Sess. 2. c. 56	19 August 1784
An Act for the effectual Transportation of Felons, and other Offenders, and to authorize the Removal of Prisoners in certain cases, and for other Purposes therein mentioned. (Repealed by Statute Law Revision Act 1871 (34 & 35 Vict. c. 116))
Crown Lands (Forfeited Estates) Act 1784 or the Disannexing Act 1784 (repealed)	24 Geo. 3. Sess. 2. c. 57	19 August 1784
An Act to enable His Majesty to grant to the Heirs of the former Proprietors, upon certain Terms and Conditions, the forfeited Estates in Scotland, which were put under the Management of a Board of Trustees, by an Act passed in the Twenty-fifth Year of the Reign of His late Majesty King George the Second, (Note: Crown Lands (Forfeited Estates) Act 1751 (25 Geo. 2. c. 41)) and to repeal the said Act. (Repealed by Statute Law Revision Act 1948 (11 & 12 Geo. 6. c. 62))
Indemnity Act 1784 (repealed)	24 Geo. 3. Sess. 2. c. 58	19 August 1784
An Act to indemnify such Persons as have omitted to qualify themselves for Offices and Employments; and to indemnify Justices of the Peace, or others, who have omitted to register or deliver in their Qualifications within the Time limited by Law; and for giving further Time for those Purposes; and to indemnify Members and Officers in Cities, Corporations and Borough Towns, whose Admissions have been omitted to be stamped according to Law, or having been stamped, have been lost or mislaid, and for allowing them Time to provide Admissions duly stamped; and to give further Time to such Persons as have omitted to make and file Affidavits of the Execution of Indentures of Clerks to Attornies and Solicitors, or to Pay the Duties on the Indentures and Contracts of Clerks, Apprentices, or Servants. (Repealed by Promissory Oaths Act 1871 (34 & 35 Vict. c. 48))
Forth and Clyde Navigation Act 1784 (repealed)	24 Geo. 3. Sess. 2. c. 59	19 August 1784
An Act for extending, amending, and altering the Powers of an Act made in the Eighth Year of the Reign of His present Majesty, intituled, "An Act for making and maintaining a navigable Cut, or Canal, from the Firth or River of Forth, at or near the Mouth of the River of Carron, in the County of Stirling, to the Firth or River of Clyde, at or near a Place called Dalmuir Burnfoot, in the County of Dumbarton; and also a collateral Cut from the same to the City of Glasgow; and for making a navigable Cut, or Canal of Communication, from the Port and Harbour of Borrowstounness, to join the said Canal, at or near the Place where it will fall into the Firth of Forth." (Note: Forth and Clyde Navigation Act 1768 (8 Geo. 3. c. 63)) (Repealed by Forth and Clyde Navigation Act 1841 (4 & 5 Vict. c. lv))
Stepney (Poor Relief, etc.) Act 1784 (repealed)	24 Geo. 3. Sess. 2. c. 60	19 August 1784
An Act for raising Money to discharge Debts contracted on account of the Poor within the Parish of Christchurch, in the County of Middlesex; for repairing and enlarging the present Workhouse of the said Parish; and for further regulating the Manner of rating to the Poor, appointing Overseers, and preserving all Accounts relating to the Offices of Churchwarden and Overseer of the Poor, and Treasurer of the same Parish. (Repealed by London Government (Borough of Stepney) Order in Council 1901 (SR&O 1901/276))
Woodstock Oxford Roads Act 1784 (repealed)	24 Geo. 3. Sess. 2. c. 61	16 July 1784
An Act for amending several Roads leading from Woodstock through Kiddington and Enstone to Rollright Lane, and from Enslow Bridge to Kiddington aforesaid, in the County of Oxford." (Repealed by Woodstock and Rollright Lane Roads Act 1804 (44 Geo. 3. c. lxxix) and Woodstock and Rollright Lane Roads (Oxfordshire) Act 1825 (6 Geo. 4. c. xciv))
Alford to Cowbridge Road Act 1784 (repealed)	24 Geo. 3. Sess. 2. c. 62	16 July 1784
An Act for enlarging the Term and Powers of an Act, made in the Fifth Year of the Reign of His present Majesty, intituled, "An Act for repairing and widening the Road from Alford to Boston, and from thence to Cowbridge, in the County of Lincoln." (Note: Alford to Cowbridge Road Act 1765 (5 Geo. 3. c. 96)) (Repealed by Alford and Boston Road Act 1827 (7 & 8 Geo. 4. c. xvii))
Devon Roads Act 1784 (repealed)	24 Geo. 3. Sess. 2. c. 63	16 July 1784
An Act to amend and render more effectual so much of Two Acts, made in the Second (Note: Devon Roads Act 1762 (2 Geo. 3. c. 50)) and Twelfth (Note: Devon Roads Act 1772 (12 Geo. 3. c. 86)) Years of the Reign of His present Majesty, for repairing, widening, and altering several Roads leading from Tavistock to Plymouth and other Places in the County of Devon, and for repairing and widening the Road from the Guildhall, in Tavistock aforesaid, through Matthew Street and Lower Brook Street to Cherrybrook and to Dunna Bridge Pound, and from the Callington Turnpike Road to Morwelham and New Quay, in the said County, as relates to the Roads leading from the Lower Market House, in Tavistock aforesaid, to Old Town Gate, in Plymouth aforesaid, and from Manadon Gate to the Old Pound, near Plymouth Dock. (Repealed by Roads from Tavistock to Plymouth and from Manadon Gate Act 1804 (44 Geo. 3. c. xvi) and Tavistock and New Bridge Roads Act 1804 (44 Geo. 3. c. lxxvi))
Totnes Roads Act 1784 (repealed)	24 Geo. 3. Sess. 2. c. 64	16 July 1784
An Act to enlarge the Term and Powers of an Act, passed in the Third Year of His present Majesty, (Note: Totnes Roads Act 1763 (3 Geo. 3. c. 38)) King George the Third, for amending and widening several Roads leading from or near the North End of the Town and Borough of Totnes, in the County of Devon. (Repealed by Ashburton Roads and Emmett Bridge Act 1809 (49 Geo. 3. c. cxxvii) and Newton Bushell, South Bovey and Moretonhampstead Roads Act 1826 (7 Geo. 4. c. xcii))
Devizes Roads Act 1784 (repealed)	24 Geo. 3. Sess. 2. c. 65	16 July 1784
An Act for completing, widening, and keeping in Repair, the Road from Rowd Ford, through the Devizes Market Place to Sheppard's Shord, and from the East End of Devizes to the Top of Red Hone, in the County of Wilts; and for changing and altering Part of the said Road. (Repealed by Road from Rowde Ford to Redhill Act 1812 (52 Geo. 3. c. xciii) (Note: Incorrectly cited as "52 Geo. 3. c. xcii" in the Chronological Table of the Statutes.) and Roads to and from Devizes Act 1820 (1 Geo. 4. c. lxix))
Llandilo Rhynws Bridge Act 1784 (repealed)	24 Geo. 3. Sess. 2. c. 66	16 July 1784
An Act for amending, widening, and keeping in Repair, the Roads leading from the Meeting House in the Parish of Llanegwad, to the Lime Kilns in the Parish of Llanddarog, and from Dan-yr-Allt, in the said Parish of Llanegwad, to Pont-y-Berem, in the Parish of Llangendeirne, in the County of Carmarthen. (Repealed by South Wales Turnpike Trusts Act 1844 (7 & 8 Vict. c. 91))
Devon Roads (No. 2) Act 1784 (repealed)	24 Geo. 3. Sess. 2. c. 67	16 July 1784
An Act for repairing and widening the Road from the Shambles, in the Borough of Plymouth, in the County of Devon, through Franckfort Gate to Stonehouse Bridge, and from the West End of the said Bridge to the Inner Barrier Gate next the Playhouse, in the Parish of Stoke Damarel, in the said County; for lighting, watching, and watering the said Road; and for regulating the Stands and Fares of Carriages using the same. (Repealed by Plymouth and Stonehouse Bridge Roads Act 1805 (45 Geo. 3. c. xxxiv))
Lancashire Roads Act 1784 (repealed)	24 Geo. 3. Sess. 2. c. 68	30 July 1784
An Act for repealing an Act made in the Twenty-sixth Year of the Reign of King George the Second, (Note: Lancashire Roads Act 1753 (26 Geo. 2. c. 63)) for repairing and widening certain Roads leading to and from the Towns of Salford, Warrington, Bolton, and Wigan, and to certain Places called the Broad Oak in Worsley and Duxbury Stocks, in the County Palatine of Lancaster, for making more effectual Provision for repairing and widening the said Roads, and also for making, altering, and widening the Road from a Place called South Sea in Pendlebury to Agecrost Bridge, and from thence through Hilton Lane to Dawson Lane End, and also from Agecrost Bridge over Kersal Moor to Singleton Brook, in the said County. (Repealed by Lancaster Roads Act 1793 (33 Geo. 3. c. 181))
Hereford Roads Act 1784 (repealed)	24 Geo. 3. Sess. 2. c. 69	13 August 1784
An Act to continue the Term, and alter and enlarge the Powers of an Act made in the Seventh Year of the Reign of His present Majesty, (Note: Hereford Roads Act 1766 (7 Geo. 3. c. 67)) for amending, repairing, and widening several Roads in the Counties of Radnor and Hereford, and for repairing and widening several other Roads in the said Counties. (Repealed by Roads in Radnor, Hereford and Merioneth Act 1824 (5 Geo. 4. c. civ))
Westmorland and Yorkshire Roads Act 1784 (repealed)	24 Geo. 3. Sess. 2. c. 70	19 August 1784
An Act for reviving, continuing, and enlarging the Term and Powers of an Act passed in the Second Year of the Reign of His present Majesty, intituled, "An Act for repairing and widening the Roads from Kirkby-Steven High Lane Head, in the County of Westmorland, through Sedbergh to Greeta Bridge, in the County Palatine of Lancaster, and from Bracken Bar-Gate, near Askrigg, in the County of York, through Sedbergh to Kirkby Kendal; and also the Road from the Four Lane Ends in Marthwaite to the Turnpike Road on Grayrigg Hause, leading from Appleby to Kirkby Kendal, in the said County of Westmorland." (Note: Lancaster and Westmorland Roads Act 1762 (2 Geo. 3. c. 83)) (Repealed by Roads from Kirkby Steven through Sedbergh to Greeta Bridge Act 1805 (45 Geo. 3. c. xxvii) and Kirkby Steven and Greeta Bridge Roads Act 1826 (7 Geo. 4. c. lxxii))

=== Private acts ===
Short title	Citation	Royal assent
Long title
Derby Estate Act 1784	24 Geo. 3. Sess. 2. c. 1 Pr.	16 July 1784
An Act for vesting part of the Estates late of the Right Honourable Edward Earl of Derby, deceased, in the several Counties of Warwick, Chester, and Cambridge, in the Right Honourable Edward the present Earl of Derby, in Fee-simple, and for settling an Estate of the said present Earl of Derby, in the County of Lancaster, of greater Value, in Lieu thereof, and in Exchange for the same.
Estates of the Bishop of St. David's and Thomas Edwards Freeman: exchange.	24 Geo. 3. Sess. 2. c. 2 Pr.	16 July 1784
An Act for establishing and confirming a certain Exchange agreed upon between the Lord Bishop of St. David's, Rector of the Parish and Parish Church of Battesford, in the County of Gloucester, and Thomas Edwards Freeman Esquire, of certain Grounds and other Hereditaments within the said Parish.
Okill Estate Act 1784	24 Geo. 3. Sess. 2. c. 3 Pr.	16 July 1784
An Act for empowering the Trustees of the Will of John Okill, deceased, to sell certain Leasehold Estates in Liverpool, in the County of Lancaster, in Preference to his Estates of Inheritance, for Payment of his Debts and Legacies, and for other Purposes therein mentioned.
Sutton Estate Act 1784	24 Geo. 3. Sess. 2. c. 4 Pr.	16 July 1784
An Act for vesting certain Parts of the settled Estates late of Sir Robert Sutton Knight, deceased, situate in the County of Lincoln, in Sir Richard Sutton Baronet, his Heirs and Assigns, and for vesting certain Lands and Hereditaments, the Estate of the said Sir Richard Sutton, situate in Bleazby and Southwell, in the County of Nottingham, in Lieu thereof to the same Uses.
Longnor Inclosure Act 1784	24 Geo. 3. Sess. 2. c. 5 Pr.	16 July 1784
An Act for dividing, allotting, and enclosing the Open Fields, undivided Enclosures, Commons, and Waste Grounds within the Manor and Lordship of Longnor, in the Parish of Allstonfield, in the County of Stafford.
Blagdon Inclosure Act 1784	24 Geo. 3. Sess. 2. c. 6 Pr.	16 July 1784
An Act for dividing and enclosing the Commons and Waste Lands within the Parish of Blagdon, in the County of Somerset.
Hextrope with Balby and Long Sandall (Yorkshire, West Riding) Inclosures Act 1784	24 Geo. 3. Sess. 2. c. 7 Pr.	16 July 1784
An Act for dividing and enclosing the several Open Fields, Meadows, Commons, and Waste Grounds within the Manors and Lordships of Hextrope, with Balby and Long Sandall in the Soke of Doncaster, in the West Riding of the County of York.
Poulain's Naturalization Act 1784	24 Geo. 3. Sess. 2. c. 8 Pr.	16 July 1784
An Act for naturalizing John Joseph Mary Poulain.
Lower Brailes Inclosure Act 1784	24 Geo. 3. Sess. 2. c. 9 Pr.	20 July 1784
An Act for dividing and enclosing certain Open and Common Fields, Meadows, and Commons, or Waste Lands, within the Parish of Lower Brailes, in the County of Warwick.
Confirmation of exchange of lands in Stanmore (Middlesex) between Reverend James Dalton, Rector of Stanmore and George Drummond.	24 Geo. 3. Sess. 2. c. 10 Pr.	20 July 1784
An Act for confirming and establishing an Exchange agreed upon between the Reverend James Dalton, Rector of the Parish of Stanmore, in the County of Middlesex, and George Drummond Esquire, of certain Lands within the said Parish.
Dalton Estate Act 1784	24 Geo. 3. Sess. 2. c. 11 Pr.	20 July 1784
An Act to explain and amend a Power vested in John Dalton Esquire, to grant Leases so far as it concerns certain Lands and Hereditaments within the Town or Precincts of Lancaster, called the Fryerage; and for the other Purposes therein mentioned.
Hamilton Estate Act 1784	24 Geo. 3. Sess. 2. c. 12 Pr.	20 July 1784
An Act for vesting the Estate of Dalziell, lying in the County of Lanark, in James Hamilton Esquire, and others, in Fee-tail, under the Conditions and Limitations within mentioned; and for vesting in the said James Hamilton, his Heirs and Assigns in Feesimple, the Estate of Rosehall, lying in the same County, in Lieu thereof.
Talbot Estate Act 1784	24 Geo. 3. Sess. 2. c. 13 Pr.	20 July 1784
An Act for vesting Part of the Estate of John Talbot Esquire, deceased, in the County of Wilts, entailed by his Will in Trustees, to be sold; and for applying the Monies arising by such Sale, in discharging the Incumbrances affecting the same.
John and Eleanor Dalrymple Marriage Settlement Act 1784	24 Geo. 3. Sess. 2. c. 14 Pr.	30 July 1784
An Act for replacing the Sum of Five thousand Five hundred Pounds, raised by Sale of Six thousand Two hundred and six Pounds Four Shillings, Three per Centum consolidated Annuities, Part of Seventeen thousand Pounds like Annuities, mentioned in the Marriage Settlement of John Dalrymple Esquire, and Eleanor his Wife, and applied in the Purchase of certain Freehold, Leasehold, and Copyhold Estates, in the County of Southampton, and for vesting such Estates in Edward Morant Esquire.
Egerton Estate Act 1784	24 Geo. 3. Sess. 2. c. 15 Pr.	30 July 1784
An Act to enable the Trustees named in the Will of Samuel Egerton Esquire, deceased, to make Leases of certain Parts of the Estates thereby devised, and for vesting Part of the Timber on certain other Parts of the devised Estates, in Trustees to be sold, for the Purposes therein mentioned.
Elrington Inclosure Act 1784	24 Geo. 3. Sess. 2. c. 16 Pr.	30 July 1784
An Act for dividing and allotting Part of the Town Fields, and the whole of the Town Green of Elrington, in the Parish of Warden, in the County of Northumberland.
Dudley Inclosure Act 1784	24 Geo. 3. Sess. 2. c. 17 Pr.	30 July 1784
An Act for dividing and enclosing certain Commons, Waste Lands, and Commonable Places, within the Manor and Parish of Dudley, in the County of Worcester.
Kingswinford Inclosure Act 1784 or the Pensnett Chase Inclosure Act 1784	24 Geo. 3. Sess. 2. c. 18 Pr.	30 July 1784
An Act for dividing and enclosing the Commons, Waste Lands, Commonable Woods, and Commonable Places, within the Manor and Parish of Kingswinford, in the County of Stafford.
Sheffield and Wadsley Inclosures Act 1784	24 Geo. 3. Sess. 2. c. 19 Pr.	30 July 1784
An Act for dividing and enclosing a large Tract of Common or Waste Ground called Loxley Chace, lying Part within the Manor of Sheffield and Part within the Manor of Wadsley, and also certain other Commons or Waste Grounds, and certain Common Fields and Mesne Inclosures, within the said Manor of Wadsley, all within the Parish of Eclesfield, in the West Riding of the County of York.
Ecclesfield, Southey and Grennofirth (Yorkshire, West Riding) Inclosures Act 1784	24 Geo. 3. Sess. 2. c. 20 Pr.	30 July 1784
An Act for dividing and enclosing the Commons and Waste Grounds within the Manor and Township of Eclesfield, and the several Sokes or Districts of Southey and Grennofirth, within the Parish of Eclesfield, in the West Riding of the County of York.
Naturalization of Emanuel Goodhart Act 1784	24 Geo. 3. Sess. 2. c. 21 Pr.	30 July 1784
An Act for Naturalizing Emanuel Goodhart.
Rowley Estate Act 1784	24 Geo. 3. Sess. 2. c. 22 Pr.	13 August 1784
An Act to enable the Trustees of the Estates devised by the Will of the late Sir William Rowley, to apply Part of the Trust Monies in rebuilding the Mansion House, called Tendring Hall, and Offices, in the County of Suffolk.
Barlow Estate Act 1784	24 Geo. 3. Sess. 2. c. 23 Pr.	13 August 1784
An Act for investing the Estates late of Thomas Barlow Esquire, deceased, in the County of Lancaster, in Trustees, to be sold to raise Money to be applied under the Direction of the Court of Chancery, in Payment of the Debts, Annuities, Incumbrances, and Legacies charged upon and affecting the same Estates; and for other Purposes therein mentioned.
Tugby Inclosure Act 1784	24 Geo. 3. Sess. 2. c. 24 Pr.	13 August 1784
An Act for dividing, allotting, and enclosing the Open Fields, Meadows, Pastures, Commons, and Commonable Places in Tugby, in the County of Leicester.
Lockton Inclosure Act 1784	24 Geo. 3. Sess. 2. c. 25 Pr.	13 August 1784
An Act for dividing, enclosing, and improving the Common Arable Fields, Common Pastures, and Commons, or Waste Grounds within the Township of Lockton, in the Parish of Middleton, in the North Riding of the County of York.
Frampton Inclosure Act 1784	24 Geo. 3. Sess. 2. c. 26 Pr.	13 August 1784
An Act for dividing and enclosing the several Open Fields, Parcels of Common Fen, and other Commonable Lands and Waste Grounds, within the Parish of Frampton, in the Parts of Holland, in the County of Lincoln; and also certain Plots of Land, called the Reaches, Marsh, and Holmes's, in and near to the said Parish of Frampton.
Dewes Estate Act 1784	24 Geo. 3. Sess. 2. c. 27 Pr.	19 August 1784
An Act for vesting Part of the settled Estates of the Reverend John Dewes Clerk, in the Counties of Hants, Surrey, and Devon, in Trustees to be sold, and for laying out the Money arising by such Sale in the Purchase of other Lands and Hereditaments, to be settled in Lieu thereof to the same Uses.
Thoroton and Croft Estate Act 1784 (repealed)	24 Geo. 3. Sess. 2. c. 28 Pr.	19 August 1784
An Act to empower Margaret Bowes Spinster, Lieutenant Colonel Thomas Thoroton and Anne his Wife, and the Reverend Robert Croft and Elizabeth his Wife, to grant Leases of their settled Estates, in the County of Northumberland and County Palatine of Durham, and for vesting certain Parts of the same Estates in Trustees to be sold, and for laying out the Purchase-Money in other Estates, to be settled to the same Uses. (Repealed by Thoroton and Croft Estate Act 1856 (19 & 20 Vict. c. 10 Pr.))
Whitworth Estate Act 1784	24 Geo. 3. Sess. 2. c. 29 Pr.	20 August 1784
An Act for vesting Part of the several Estates of Richard Whitworth Esquire, in the County of Stafford, in Trustees, to be exchanged for Part of his unsettled Estates in the same County, of greater Value.

=== Sources ===
- Pickering, Danby, ed. (1782). "Anno vicesimo quarto Georgii III". The Statutes of the Realm. Vol. 34. Cambridge. pp. 407–756 – via Google Books.
- Journals of the House of Commons. Vol. 40. London: His Majesty's Stationery Office. 1803. pp. 5–451 – via Google Books.
- Chronological Table of and Index to the Statutes. Vol. 1: To the End of the Session 59 Vict. Sess. 2 (1895) (13th ed.). London: Her Majesty's Stationery Office. 1896. pp. 142–143 – via Google Books.

== See also ==
- List of acts of the Parliament of Great Britain
