= Glass tax =

The glass tax was introduced in Great Britain in 1746, during the reign of King George II, by the National Debt Act 1745 (19 Geo. 2. c. 12).

Originally, these acts taxed the raw materials used for glass making. Glass was at that time sold by weight, and manufacturers responded by producing smaller, more highly decorated objects, often with hollow stems, known today as "Excise glasses".

The impact of these taxes was that many glassworks had to move their businesses to bordering countries, most frequently to Ireland. In 1780, the government granted Ireland free trade in glass without taxation, resulting in the establishment of glassworks in Cork and Waterford.

After the campaigns against those acts, glass tax was shifted by the Duties on Glass Act 1811 (51 Geo. 3. c. 69) to all products made from glass, for examples green glass bottles, windows and flint glass. The heavy decorative glass objects and large windows became the symbol of wealth in this time period. This also meant that only the very wealthy could afford green houses and the fruit grown in them.

By the Duties on Glass, etc. Act 1825 (6 Geo. 4. c. 117) the excise on glass were amended again, including raw materials as well as rising the taxation rates on finished glass goods.

Gradually the industry declined, until the glass tax was abolished by Sir Robert Peel's government by the Glass Duties Repeal Act 1845 (8 & 9 Vict. c. 6).

A contemporary account in the medical journal The Lancet described the glass tax as an "absurd impost on light":

In a hygienic point of view, the enormous tax on glass, amounting to more than three hundred per cent on its value, is one of the most cruel a Government could inflict on the nation ... The deficiency of light in town habitations, in a great measure caused by the enormous cost of glass, is universally admitted to be one of the principal causes of the unhealthiness of cities ...

== See also ==
- Window tax
